= Apolipoprotein C-III =

Protein-coding gene in the species Homo sapiens

APOC3
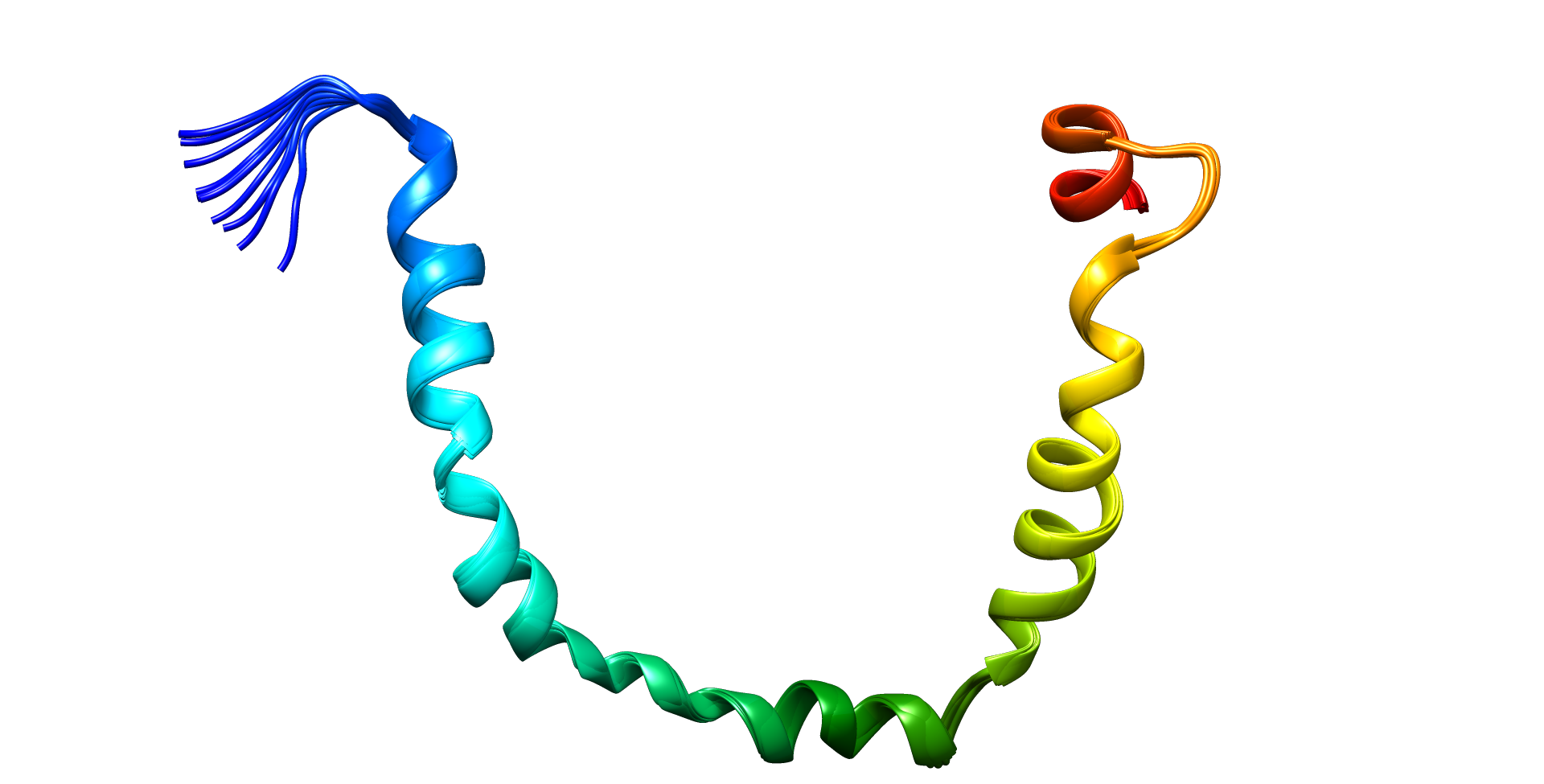

Identifiers
- Aliases: APOC3, APOCIII, HALP2, apolipoprotein C3, Apo-C3, ApoC-3, apolipoprotein CIII, Apo-CIII, IPR008403, apolipoprotein C-III
- External IDs: OMIM: 107720; MGI: 88055; GeneCards: APOC3
Available structures
PDB	Ortholog search: PDBe RCSB
PDB	List of PDB id codes 2JQ3

Gene location (Human)
Chr.	Chromosome 11 (human)
Band	11q23.3	Start	116,829,706 bp
Band	11q23.3	End	116,833,072 bp

Gene location (Mouse)
Chr.	Chromosome 9 (mouse)
Band	9 A5.2|9 25.36 cM	Start	46,144,231 bp
Band	9 A5.2|9 25.36 cM	End	46,146,934 bp
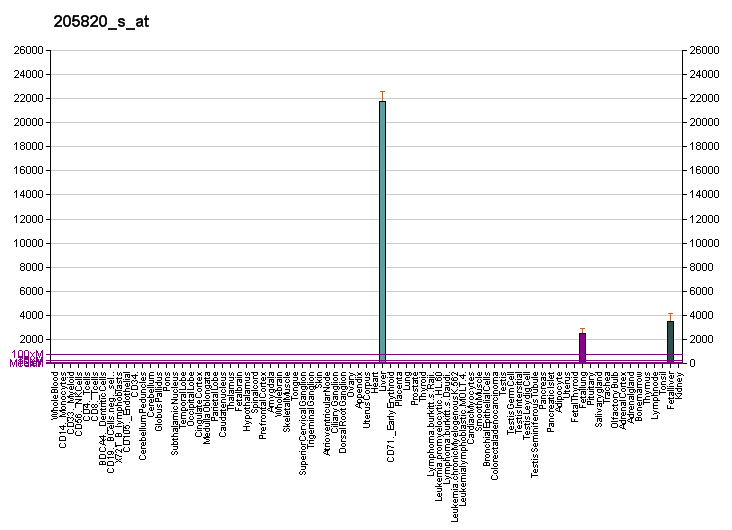
RNA expression pattern
Bgee	Human / Mouse (ortholog); Top expressed in: jejunal mucosa; right lobe of liver; mucosa of ileum; duodenum; gonad; amniotic fluid; human kidney; epithelium of colon; metanephros; left uterine tube / Top expressed in: left lobe of liver; duodenum; jejunum; migratory enteric neural crest cell; yolk sac; ileum; right kidney; proximal tubule; median eminence; intestinal epithelium; More reference expression data
BioGPS	More reference expression data
Gene ontology
Molecular function	lipid binding; lipase inhibitor activity; enzyme regulator activity; high-density lipoprotein particle receptor binding; cholesterol binding; phospholipid binding
Cellular component	chylomicron; very-low-density lipoprotein particle; spherical high-density lipoprotein particle; extracellular region; early endosome; extracellular exosome; intermediate-density lipoprotein particle; extracellular space; extracellular matrix; collagen-containing extracellular matrix
Biological process	negative regulation of cholesterol import; G protein-coupled receptor signaling pathway; negative regulation of very-low-density lipoprotein particle remodeling; lipid transport; chylomicron remnant clearance; negative regulation of fatty acid biosynthetic process; regulation of Cdc42 protein signal transduction; lipid metabolism; negative regulation of high-density lipoprotein particle clearance; phospholipid efflux; negative regulation of low-density lipoprotein particle clearance; negative regulation of very-low-density lipoprotein particle clearance; retinoid metabolic process; negative regulation of receptor-mediated endocytosis; lipid catabolic process; cholesterol efflux; negative regulation of lipoprotein lipase activity; cholesterol homeostasis; very-low-density lipoprotein particle assembly; negative regulation of triglyceride catabolic process; negative regulation of lipid catabolic process; negative regulation of lipid metabolic process; reverse cholesterol transport; triglyceride homeostasis; triglyceride metabolic process; triglyceride catabolic process; chylomicron remodeling; high-density lipoprotein particle remodeling; chylomicron assembly; lipoprotein metabolic process; transport
Sources:Amigo / QuickGO
Orthologs
Databases	NCBI: entry; OMA: entry
Species	Human	Mouse
Entrez	345	11814
Ensembl	ENSG00000110245	ENSMUSG00000032081
UniProt	P02656	P33622
RefSeq (mRNA)	NM_000040	NM_023114; NM_001289755; NM_001289756; NM_001289833
RefSeq (protein)	NP_000031	NP_001276684; NP_001276685; NP_001276762; NP_075603
Location (UCSC)	Chr 11: 116.83 – 116.83 Mb	Chr 9: 46.14 – 46.15 Mb
PubMed search
- Wikidata
View/Edit Human	View/Edit Mouse

Apolipoprotein C-III also known as apo-CIII, and apolipoprotein C3, is a protein that in humans is encoded by the APOC3 gene. Apo-CIII is secreted by the liver as well as the small intestine, and is found on triglyceride-rich lipoproteins such as chylomicrons, very low density lipoprotein (VLDL), and remnant cholesterol.

== Structure ==
ApoC-III

Identifiers
- Symbol: ApoC-III
- Pfam: PF05778
- InterPro: IPR008403
Available protein structures:
- PDB: IPR008403 PF05778 (ECOD; PDBsum)
- AlphaFold: IPR008403; PF05778

ApoC-III is a relatively small protein containing 79 amino acids that can be glycosylated at threonine-74. The most abundant glycoforms are characterized by an O-linked disaccharide galactose linked to N-acetylgalactosamine (Gal–GalNAc), further modified with up to two sialic acid residues. Less abundant glycoforms are characterized by more complex and fucosylated glycan moieties.

== Function ==
APOC3 inhibits lipoprotein lipase and hepatic lipase; it is thought to inhibit hepatic uptake of triglyceride-rich particles. The APOA1, APOC3 and APOA4 genes are closely linked in both rat and human genomes. The A-I and A-IV genes are transcribed from the same strand, while the A-1 and C-III genes are convergently transcribed. An increase in apoC-III levels induces the development of hypertriglyceridemia. Recent evidence suggests an intracellular role for Apo-CIII in promoting the assembly and secretion of triglyceride-rich VLDL particles from hepatic cells under lipid-rich conditions. However, two naturally occurring point mutations in human apoC3 coding sequence, namely Ala23Thr and Lys58Glu have been shown to abolish the intracellular assembly and secretion of triglyceride-rich VLDL particles from hepatic cells.

== Clinical significance ==
Overexpression of Apo-CIII in humans contributes to atherosclerosis. Two novel susceptibility haplotypes (specifically, P2-S2-X1 and P1-S2-X1) have been discovered in ApoAI-CIII-AIV gene cluster on chromosome 11q23; these confer approximately threefold higher risk of coronary heart disease in normal as well as non-insulin diabetes mellitus. In persons with type 2 diabetes, elevated plasma Apo-CIII is associated with higher plasma triglycerides and greater coronary artery calcification (a measure of subclinical atherosclerosis).

Apo-CIII delays the catabolism of triglyceride rich particles. HDL cholesterol particles that bear Apo-CIII are associated with increased, rather than decreased, risk for coronary heart disease.

Elevations of Apo-CIII associated with single-nucleotide polymorphisms found in genetic variation studies may predispose patients to metabolic dysfunction–associated steatotic liver disease, although the association has been questioned and may be specific to certain ethnicities or to people without central obesity.

Antisense oligonucleotides that bind APOC3 mRNA and prevent its translation have been found to reduce episodes of acute pancreatitis in people with familial chylomicronemia syndrome and lower their triglyceride levels in blood. Adverse effects include thrombocytopenia, which may be prevented by targeting hepatocellular APOC3 expression with a chemically modified oligonucleotide.

== Interactive pathway map ==
Click on genes, proteins and metabolites below to link to respective articles. (Note: The interactive pathway map can be edited at WikiPathways: "Statin_Pathway_WP430".)

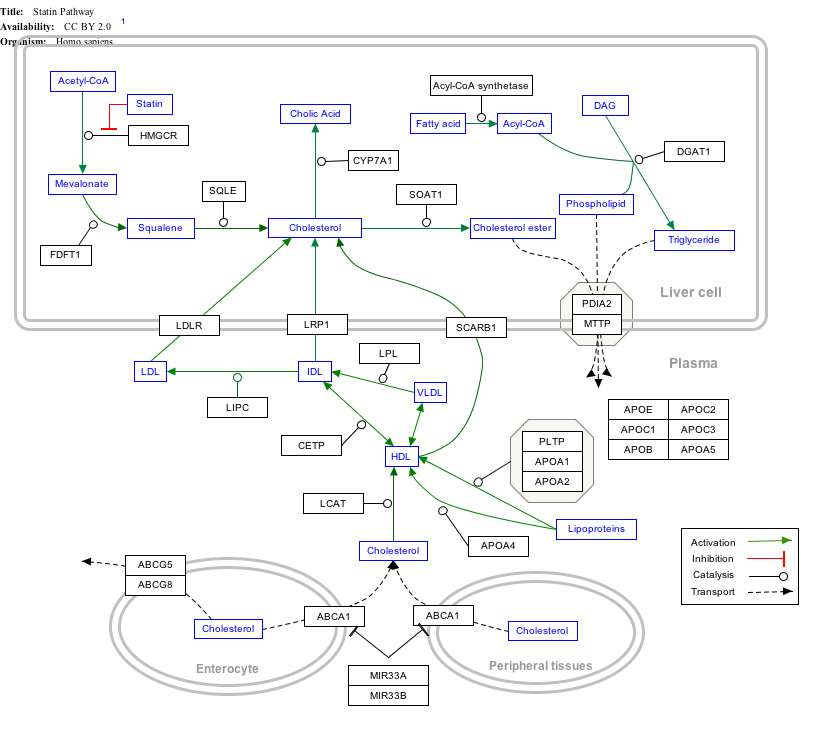

Statin pathway edit

== Apolipoprotein CIII and HDL ==
Apolipoprotein CIII is also found on HDL particles. Formation of APOCIII-containing HDL is not a matter of simple binding of APOCII to pre-existing HDL particles but requires the lipid transported ABCA1 in a fashion similar to APOA1-containing HDL. Accumulation of APOCIII on HDL is important for the maintenance of plasma triglyceride homeostasis since it prevents excessive amount of APOCIII on VLDL and other triglyceride rich lipoproteins, thus preventing APOCIII-mediated inhibition of LpL and the subsequent hydrolysis of plasma triglycerides. This may explain the hypertriglyceridemia associated with ABCA1-deficiency in patients with Tangier's disease.
