= Jim Otvos =

James D. Otvos is an academic/researcher/entrepreneur in nuclear magnetic resonance spectroscopy who has pioneered and published, since the later 1970s, extensive research on the roles of the various lipoproteins in cardiovascular disease and led the company, LipoScience, which developed the Vantera Analyzer.

From 1950 (when the first research was published identifying lipoproteins as the primary driver of the atherosclerosis process) through the 1990s, the basic science work which led to sub-fractionation of lipoprotein particles: chylomicrons (AKA ULDL), VLDL, IDL, LDL & HDL had long remained too expensive for routine use in clinical medicine. This issue was (and is) complicated by the multiple sub-distinctions within these groupings.

While this work was a giant breakthrough in understanding how fat molecules (needed and manipulated by all cells in the body) are carried within the water-based blood and intracellular transport systems, work which led to a Nobel Prize in Medicine in 1985 for identification of the LDL receptor protein via which cells ingest (termed endocytosis) LDL particles, cost (about US$5,000 per blood sample in the 1970s for the ultracentrifugation and gradient-gel electrophoresis methods which had been developed and utilized in earlier research) remained a major barrier to clinical use of this valuable information.

In the early 1990s, given increasing evidence and understanding of the role which the many different lipoproteins (not cholesterol per-se) played in the usual progression of atherosclerotic disease, Otvos began novel research work in using NMR spectroscopy to quantify the lipoproteins in first primate and then human plasma. This in turn led to giant decreases in cost while improving accuracy.

His work has led to several rewards for both accuracy and, even more importantly, for great reductions in the cost to patients of having quantitative lipoprotein fractionation; it is no longer just an expensive research tool but has become low enough in cost for most physicians and patients to use the methodology to greatly improve treatment strategies and greatly reducing cardiovascular event rates without resorting to only arterial bypass surgery or angioplasty/stents to treat the symptoms of advanced disease, often after the individual has become permanently disabled.
