= Apovitellenin-1 =

Apo-VLDL-II

Identifiers
- Symbol: Apo-VLDL-II
- Pfam: PF05418
- InterPro: IPR008404
Available protein structures:
- Pfam: structures / ECOD
- PDB: RCSB PDB; PDBe; PDBj
- PDBsum: structure summary

In molecular biology, apovitellenin-1 is a family of proteins found in birds. As part of the avian reproductive effort, large quantities of triglyceride-rich very-low-density lipoprotein (VLDL) particles are transported by receptor-mediated endocytosis into the female germ cells, apovitellenin-1 is a protein component of this VLDL. Although the oocytes are surrounded by a layer of granulosa cells harbouring high levels of active lipoprotein lipase, non-lipolysed VLDL is transported into the yolk. This is because the VLDL particles are protected from lipolysis by apovitellenin-1a, which acts as a potent dimeric lipoprotein lipase inhibitor. Apo-VLDL-II is produced in the liver and secreted into the blood stream when induced by estrogen production in female birds.
