= Reverse cholesterol transport =

Reverse cholesterol transport (RCT) is a multistep process comprising removal of excess cholesterol from cells in the body and delivery to the liver for excretion into the small intestine.

Enhancing reverse cholesterol transport is considered a potential strategy for preventing and treating atherosclerosis and associated diseases such as cardiovascular disease and stroke. Atherosclerosis is caused by the build-up in arterial blood vessels of atherosclerotic plaques. These consist mostly of foam cells, which are macrophages overloaded with cholesterol and other lipids. Foam cells and other cells in peripheral tissues can hand over their excess cholesterol to high-density lipoprotein (HDL) particles. These will transport the cholesterol via the lymph and then the blood stream to the liver, from where it will be excreted with bile into the small intestine. Reverse cholesterol transport thereby works against the build-up of atherosclerotic plaques from dying foam cells.

In more detail, reverse cholesterol transport proceeds in the following steps:

1. Formation of nascent HDL: The liver and intestines produce nascent, cholesterol-free high-density lipoprotein (HDL) particles, primarily composed of Apolipoprotein A1 (ApoA-1).
2. Cholesterol efflux from peripheral cells: Peripheral cells, including macrophage-derived foam cells, excrete excess cholesterol through their plasma membrane, via ABCA1 (ATP-binding cassette transporter) and ABCG1 transporter proteins. Nascent HDL particles, bound on the outside of the cells to ABCA1 and ABCG1, take up the cholesterol. The HDL particles then get transported with the interstitial fluid (the fluid between cells) to the lymphatic system and from there to the bloodstream.
3. Esterification of cholesterol: Within HDL particles, the enzyme lecithin-cholesterol acyltransferase (LCAT) esterifies free cholesterol into cholesteryl esters, which migrate to the core of the HDL particle, transforming it into a mature, spherical form.
4. Direct hepatic uptake: The mature HDL in the blood can deliver cholesteryl esters directly to the liver through interactions with hepatic receptors such as scavenger receptor class B type I (SR-BI).
5. Alternate route by cholesteryl ester transfer: Cholesterylester transfer protein (CETP) facilitates the exchange of cholesteryl esters in HDL with tryglycerides in ApoB-containing lipoprotein particles (LDL, VLDL, IDL). These lipoprotein particles can then deliver cholesterol to the liver via its LDL receptors. (These particles are mostly responsible to transport cholesterol from the liver to peripheral cells, as part of the normal, "non-reverse" direction of cholesterol transport.)
6. Excretion of cholesterol: The liver converts the excess cholesterol into bile acids or secretes it directly into bile, which is then excreted into the small intestine. A portion of this cholesterol is eliminated from the body via feces, completing the RCT process.

Through these steps, RCT plays a vital role in maintaining cholesterol homeostasis and preventing the accumulation of cholesterol in peripheral tissues, thereby reducing the risk of cardiovascular diseases.

While excess fat (lipids) can simply be catabolized (burned) by cells as energy source, cholesterol's complex molecular structure cannot be efficiently catabolized. Therefore, excess peripheral cholesterol is recycled to the liver via RCT.

== Regulation ==
Adiponectin induces ABCA1-mediated reverse cholesterol transport from macrophages by activation of PPAR-γ and LXRα/β.

== Estimating transport ability ==
High-density lipoprotein cholesterol (HDL-C) refers to the total cholesterol content carried by all HDL particles in the bloodstream. Traditionally the amount of HDL-C is used as a proxy to measure the amount of HDL particles, and from there a proxy for the reverse cholesterol transport capacity. However, a number of conditions that increase reverse cholesterol transport (e.g. being male) will reduce HDL-C due to the greater clearance of HDL, making such a test unreliable. In fact, when many known correlates of CVD risks are controlled for, HDL-C does not have any correlation with cardiovascular event risks. In this way, HDL-C only seems to serve as an imperfect, but easy-to-measure, proxy for a healthy lifestyle.

The actual cholesterol efflux capacity (CEC) is measured directly: one takes a blood sample from the patient, isolates the serum, and removes any ApoB-containg particles from it. Mouse macrophages are incubated in an ACAT inhibitor and radioisotope-labelled cholesterol, then have their efflux ability "woken up" with an ABCA1 agonist before use. They are then mixed with the prepared serum. The macrophages are then recovered to quantify their change in radioactivity compared to a control batch. Any extra loss in radioactivity is interpreted to have been taken up by the HDL particles in the patient's serum. (This test does not account for the liver-bile-feces part of the transport.)

== Clinical relevance ==
The cholesterol efflux capacity (CEC) has much better correlation with CVD risks and CVD event frequencies, even when controlling for known correlates. Many drugs affect enzymes and receptors involved in the transport process:

- Nicotinic acid (niacin) lowers LDL-C and increases HDL-C. It does not lower the risk of cardiovascular events. It stimulates ABCA1 but inhibits hepatic uptake through the CETP route. It also increases ApoA-I levels by preventing its breakdown. It has minimal effects on CEC.
- Some CETP inhibitors have been made to try and increase HDL-C. However, they end up reducing reverse transport and increasing cardiovascular risks. A 2016 source says that they increase non-ABCA1-mediated CEC.
- Fibrates activate PPAR-α, which as a result upregulates ABCA1, ABCG5, and ABCG8. Not all of them have shown expected improvements when combined with a statin. Fenofibrate appears to have better cardiovascular outcomes than some other fibrates. Part of that may be because gemfibrozil increases the breakdown of ApoA-I. In mice, fenofibrate increases macrophage-to-feces reverse transport, while gemfibrozil does not.
- Probucol decreases LDL-C but, alarmingly, also HDL-C. It promotes LDL uptake, inhibits ABCA1, enhances CETP, and enhances SR-BI. The net effect is an increase in reverse transport.
- Statins either have minimal effects on CEC or slightly decrease it. Statins are known to reduce CV risks.
- Exogenous Apo A-I, several forms of which are being developed as medication, increase CEC. Another drug in development increases the body's production of Apo A-I. Their effects on CV risks are being studied.
- The effects of diabetes medication on CEC are poorly studied. There is only information of pioglitazone, which seems to increase CEC.
- Diet and exercise have little effect on CEC among non-athletes. In athletes it seems to increase a little together with Apo A-I and HDL-C.
