= Lipoprotein =

Biochemical assembly for transporting hydrophobic lipid molecules

Structure of a chylomicron (the largest lipoprotein). ApoA, ApoB, ApoC, ApoE are apolipoproteins; green particles are phospholipids; T is triglyceride; C is cholesterol ester.

A lipoprotein is a biochemical assembly whose primary function is to transport hydrophobic lipid (also known as fat) molecules in water, as in blood plasma or other extracellular fluids. They consist of a triglyceride and cholesterol center, surrounded by a phospholipid outer shell, with the hydrophilic portions oriented outward toward the surrounding water and lipophilic portions oriented inward toward the lipid center. A special kind of protein, called apolipoprotein, is embedded in the outer shell, both stabilising the complex and giving it a functional identity that determines its role.

Plasma lipoprotein particles are commonly divided into five main classes, based on size, lipid composition, and apolipoprotein content. They are, in increasing size order: HDL, LDL, IDL, VLDL and chylomicrons. Subgroups of these plasma particles are primary drivers or modulators of atherosclerosis.

Many enzymes, transporters, structural proteins, antigens, adhesins, and toxins are sometimes also classified as lipoproteins, since they are formed by lipids and proteins.

== Scope ==
=== Transmembrane lipoproteins ===
Some transmembrane proteolipids, especially those found in bacteria, are referred to as lipoproteins; they are not related to the lipoprotein particles that this article is about. Such transmembrane proteins are difficult to isolate, as they bind tightly to the lipid membrane, often require lipids to display the proper structure, and can be water-insoluble. Detergents are usually required to isolate transmembrane lipoproteins from their associated biological membranes.

=== Plasma lipoprotein particles ===
Because fats are insoluble in water, they cannot be transported on their own in extracellular water, including blood plasma. Instead, they are surrounded by a hydrophilic external shell that functions as a transport vehicle. The role of lipoprotein particles is to transport fat molecules, such as triglycerides, phospholipids, and cholesterol within the extracellular water of the body to all the cells and tissues of the body. The proteins included in the external shell of these particles, called apolipoproteins, are synthesized and secreted into the extracellular water by both the small intestine and liver cells. The external shell also contains phospholipids and cholesterol.

All cells use and rely on fats and cholesterol as building blocks to create the multiple membranes that cells use both to control internal water content and internal water-soluble elements and to organize their internal structure and protein enzymatic systems. The outer shell of lipoprotein particles have the hydrophilic groups of phospholipids, cholesterol, and apolipoproteins directed outward. Such characteristics make them soluble in the salt-water-based blood pool. Triglycerides and cholesteryl esters are carried internally, shielded from the water by the outer shell. The kind of apolipoproteins contained in the outer shell determines the functional identity of the lipoprotein particles. The interaction of these apolipoproteins with enzymes in the blood, with each other, or with specific proteins on the surfaces of cells, determines whether triglycerides and cholesterol will be added to or removed from the lipoprotein transport particles.

Characterization in human plasma

	Chylomicrons	VLDL	LDL	HDL
Electrophoretic mobility	Origin	Pre-Beta	Beta	Alpha
Density	less than 0.96	0.96-1.006	1.006-1.063	1.063-1.21
Diameter (nm)	100-1000	30-90	20-25	10-20
Apolipoproteins	B_{48}, Al, All	B_{100} CI, CII	B_{100}	AI, AII, CI
Composition (% of total content)				
· Protein	2	10	20	40
· Lipid	98	90	80	60
Lipid component (% of total lipid content)				
· Triglycerides	88	55	12	12
· Cholesteryl esters	4	24	59	40
· Phospholipids	8	20	28	47
· Free fatty acids	-	1	1	1

== Structure ==
Lipoproteins are complex particles that have a central hydrophobic core of non-polar lipids, primarily cholesteryl esters and triglycerides. This hydrophobic core is surrounded by a hydrophilic membrane consisting of phospholipids, free cholesterol, and apolipoproteins. Plasma lipoproteins, found in blood plasma, are typically divided into five main classes based on size, lipid composition, and apolipoprotein content: HDL, LDL, IDL, VLDL and chylomicrons.

== Functions ==
=== Metabolism ===
The handling of lipoprotein particles in the body is referred to as lipoprotein particle metabolism. It is divided into two pathways, exogenous and endogenous, depending in large part on whether the lipoprotein particles in question are composed chiefly of dietary (exogenous) lipids or whether they originated in the liver (endogenous), through de novo synthesis of triglycerides.

The hepatocytes are the main platform for the handling of triglycerides and cholesterol; the liver can also store certain amounts of glycogen and triglycerides. While adipocytes are the main storage cells for triglycerides, they do not produce any lipoproteins.

==== Exogenous pathway ====
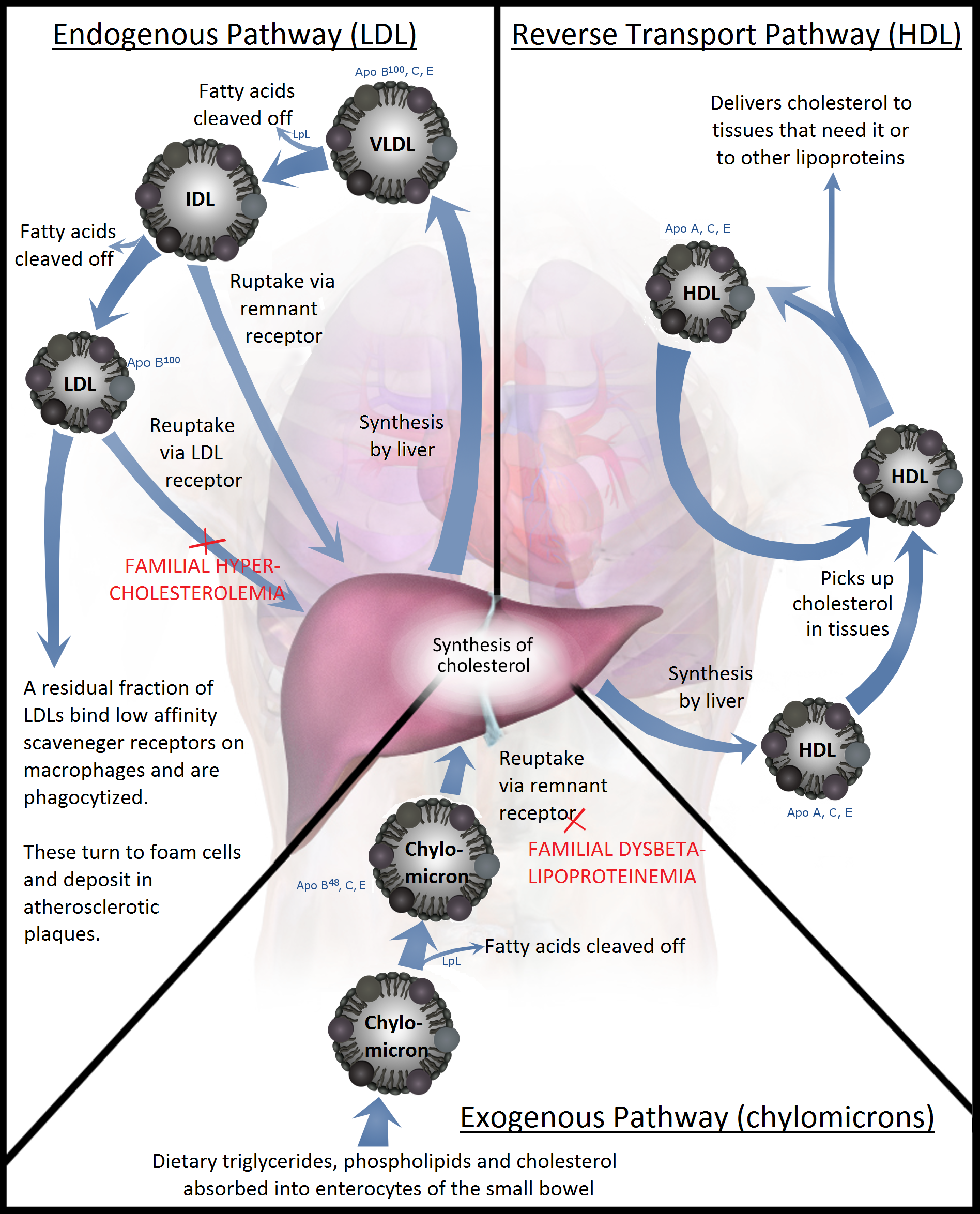
Simplified flowchart showing the essentials of lipoprotein metabolism.

Bile emulsifies fats contained in the chyme, then pancreatic lipase cleaves triglyceride molecules into two fatty acids and one 2-monoacylglycerol. Enterocytes readily absorb the small molecules from the chymus. Inside of the enterocytes, fatty acids and monoacylglycerides are transformed again into triglycerides. Then these lipids are assembled with apolipoprotein B-48 into nascent chylomicrons. These particles are then secreted into the lacteals in a process that depends heavily on apolipoprotein B-48. As they circulate through the lymphatic vessels, nascent chylomicrons bypass the liver circulation and are drained via the thoracic duct into the bloodstream.

In the blood stream, nascent chylomicron particles interact with HDL particles, resulting in HDL donation of apolipoprotein C-II and apolipoprotein E to the nascent chylomicron. The chylomicron at this stage is then considered mature. Via apolipoprotein C-II, mature chylomicrons activate lipoprotein lipase (LPL), an enzyme on endothelial cells lining the blood vessels. LPL catalyzes the hydrolysis of triglycerides that ultimately releases glycerol and fatty acids from the chylomicrons. Glycerol and fatty acids can then be absorbed in peripheral tissues, especially adipose and muscle, for energy and storage.

The hydrolyzed chylomicrons are now called chylomicron remnants. The chylomicron remnants continue circulating the bloodstream until they interact via apolipoprotein E with chylomicron remnant receptors, found chiefly in the liver. This interaction causes the endocytosis of the chylomicron remnants, which are subsequently hydrolyzed within lysosomes. Lysosomal hydrolysis releases glycerol and fatty acids into the cell, which can be used for energy or stored for later use.

==== Endogenous pathway ====
The liver is the central platform for the handling of lipids: it is able to store glycerols and fats in its cells, the hepatocytes. Hepatocytes are also able to create triglycerides via de novo synthesis. They also produce the bile from cholesterol. The intestines are responsible for absorbing cholesterol. They transfer it over into the blood stream.

In the hepatocytes, triglycerides and cholesteryl esters are assembled with apolipoprotein B-100 to form nascent VLDL particles. Nascent VLDL particles are released into the bloodstream via a process that depends upon apolipoprotein B-100.

In the blood stream, nascent VLDL particles bump with HDL particles; as a result, HDL particles donate apolipoprotein C-II and apolipoprotein E to the nascent VLDL particle. Once loaded with apolipoproteins C-II and E, the nascent VLDL particle is considered mature. VLDL particles circulate and encounter LPL expressed on endothelial cells. Apolipoprotein C-II activates LPL, causing hydrolysis of the VLDL particle and the release of glycerol and fatty acids. These products can be absorbed from the blood by peripheral tissues, principally adipose and muscle. The hydrolyzed VLDL particles are now called VLDL remnants or intermediate-density lipoproteins (IDLs). VLDL remnants can circulate and, via an interaction between apolipoprotein E and the remnant receptor, be absorbed by the liver, or they can be further hydrolyzed by hepatic lipase.

Hydrolysis by hepatic lipase releases glycerol and fatty acids, leaving behind IDL remnants, called low-density lipoproteins (LDL), which contain a relatively high cholesterol content (see native LDL structure at 37°C on YouTube). LDL circulates and is absorbed by the liver and peripheral cells. Binding of LDL to its target tissue occurs through an interaction between the LDL receptor and apolipoprotein B-100 on the LDL particle. Absorption occurs through endocytosis, and the internalized LDL particles are hydrolyzed within lysosomes, releasing lipids, chiefly cholesterol.

==== Reverse transport pathway ====
To remove excess cholesterol from peripheral cells, hepatocytes and enterocytes produce low-cholesterol nascent HDL particles with apolipoprotein A-I and phospholipid, and release them into bloodstream. Apolipoprotein C and apolipoprotein E from returning chylomicron, VLDL, and IDL particles are donated back to nascent HDL. Peripheral cells release cholesterol through the cell membrane via ATP-binding cassette transporter (ABCA1) and ATP-binding cassette sub-family G member 1 (ABCG1) transporter protein, which is taken up by nascent HDL particles to form larger mature HDL_{3} particles. Free cholesterol are esterified by lecithin-cholesterol acyltransferase (LCAT) into more hydrophobic cholesterol ester within the HDL_{3} particles to maximize capacity. Cholesteryl ester transfer protein (CETP) then facilitates the exchange of triglycerides from LDL, IDL, and VLDL with cholesterol ester, apolipoprotein C, and apolipoprotein E from the mature HDL_{3} to form less dense mature HDL_{2} particles. These LDL, IDL, and VLDL transport the cholesterol ester back to liver cells in a process called indirect reverse cholesterol transport (indirect RCT).

The triglycerides content within mature HDL_{2} particles are hydrolyzed by hepatic triglyceride lipase (HTGL) into free fatty acids upon returning to liver. Other mature HDL_{2} particles may deliver the remaining cholesterol ester directly to hepatocytes by interacting with scavenger receptor class B type 1 (SR-BI) receptors on the cell membrane in direct RCT. Both of these pathways result in nascent HDL particles for a new cycle of reverse cholesterol transport or to be excreted through renal clearance.

=== Possible role in oxygen transport ===
Plasma lipoproteins may carry oxygen gas. This property is due to the crystalline hydrophobic structure of lipids, providing a suitable environment for O_{2} solubility compared to an aqueous medium.

=== Role in inflammation ===
Inflammation, a biological system response to stimuli such as the introduction of a pathogen, has an underlying role in numerous systemic biological functions and pathologies. This is a useful response by the immune system when the body is exposed to pathogens, such as bacteria in locations that will prove harmful, but can also have detrimental effects if left unregulated. It has been demonstrated that lipoproteins, specifically HDL, have important roles in the inflammatory process.

When the body is functioning under normal, stable physiological conditions, HDL has been shown to be beneficial in several ways. LDL contains apolipoprotein B (apoB), which allows LDL to bind to different tissues, such as the artery wall if the glycocalyx has been damaged by high blood sugar levels. If oxidised, the LDL can become trapped in the proteoglycans, preventing its removal by HDL cholesterol efflux. Normal functioning HDL is able to prevent the process of oxidation of LDL and the subsequent inflammatory processes seen after oxidation.

Lipopolysaccharide, or LPS, is the major pathogenic factor on the cell wall of Gram-negative bacteria. Gram-positive bacteria has a similar component named Lipoteichoic acid, or LTA. HDL has the ability to bind LPS and LTA, creating HDL-LPS complexes to neutralize the harmful effects in the body and clear the LPS from the body. HDL also has significant roles interacting with cells of the immune system to modulate the availability of cholesterol and modulate the immune response.

Under certain abnormal physiological conditions such as system infection or sepsis, the major components of HDL become altered, The composition and quantity of lipids and apolipoproteins are altered as compared to normal physiological conditions, such as a decrease in HDL cholesterol (HDL-C), phospholipids, apoA-I (a major lipoprotein in HDL that has been shown to have beneficial anti-inflammatory properties), and an increase in Serum amyloid A. This altered composition of HDL is commonly referred to as acute-phase HDL in an acute-phase inflammatory response, during which time HDL can lose its ability to inhibit the oxidation of LDL. In fact, this altered composition of HDL is associated with increased mortality and worse clinical outcomes in patients with sepsis.

== Classification ==
=== By density ===
Lipoproteins may be classified as five major groups, listed from larger and lower density to smaller and higher density. Lipoproteins are larger and less dense when the fat to protein ratio is increased. They are classified on the basis of electrophoresis, ultracentrifugation and nuclear magnetic resonance spectroscopy via the Vantera Analyzer.

- Chylomicrons carry triglycerides (fat) from the intestines to the liver, to skeletal muscle, and to adipose tissue.
- Very-low-density lipoproteins (VLDL) carry (newly synthesised) triglycerides from the liver to adipose tissue.
- Intermediate-density lipoproteins (IDL) are intermediate between VLDL and LDL. They are not usually detectable in the blood when fasting.
- Low-density lipoproteins (LDL) carry 3,000 to 6,000 fat molecules (phospholipids, cholesterol, triglycerides, etc.) around the body. LDL particles are sometimes referred to as "bad" lipoprotein, because concentrations of two kinds of LDL (sd-LDL and LPA) correlate with atherosclerosis progression. In healthy individuals, most LDL is large and buoyant (lb LDL).
  - large buoyant LDL (lb LDL) particles
  - small dense LDL (sd LDL) particles
  - Lipoprotein(a) (LPA) is a lipoprotein particle of a certain phenotype
- High-density lipoproteins (HDL) collect fat molecules from the body's cells/tissues and take them back to the liver. HDLs are sometimes referred to as "good" lipoprotein because higher concentrations correlate with low rates of atherosclerosis progression and/or regression.

For young healthy research subjects, ~70 kg (154 lb), these data represent averages across individuals studied, percentages represent % dry weight:

Density (g/mL)	Class	Diameter (nm)	% protein	% cholesterol & cholesterol ester	% phospholipid	% triglyceride
>1.063	HDL	5–15	33	30	29	4-8
1.019–1.063	LDL	18–28	25	46-50	21-22	8-10
1.006–1.019	IDL	25–50	18	29	22	31
0.95–1.006	VLDL	30–80	10	22	18	50
<0.95	Chylomicrons	75-1200	1-2	8	7	83-84

However, these data are not necessarily reliable for any one individual or for the general clinical population.

=== Alpha and beta ===
It is also possible to classify lipoproteins as "alpha" and "beta", according to the classification of proteins in serum protein electrophoresis. This terminology is sometimes used in describing lipid disorders such as abetalipoproteinemia.

=== Subdivisions ===
Lipoproteins, such as LDL and HDL, can be further subdivided into subspecies isolated through a variety of methods. These are subdivided by density or by the protein contents/ proteins they carry. While the research is currently ongoing, researchers are learning that different subspecies contain different apolipoproteins, proteins, and lipid contents between species which have different physiological roles. For example, within the HDL lipoprotein subspecies, a large number of proteins are involved in general lipid metabolism. However, it is being elucidated that HDL subspecies also contain proteins involved in the following functions: homeostasis, fibrinogen, clotting cascade, inflammatory and immune responses, including the complement system, proteolysis inhibitors, acute-phase response proteins, and the LPS-binding protein, heme and iron metabolism, platelet regulation, vitamin binding and general transport.

== Research ==
High levels of lipoprotein(a) are a significant risk factor for atherosclerotic cardiovascular diseases via mechanisms associated with inflammation and thrombosis. The links of mechanisms between different lipoprotein isoforms and risk for cardiovascular diseases, lipoprotein synthesis, regulation, and metabolism, and related risks for genetic diseases are under active research, as of 2022.

== See also ==
- Lipid anchored protein
- Remnant cholesterol
- Reverse cholesterol transport
- Vertical Auto Profile
