= TLC-2716 =

TLC-2716 is an experimental drug and LXR inverse agonist that reduced triglycerides and remnant cholesterol in a clinical trial.
