= Remnant cholesterol =

Atherogenic lipoprotein

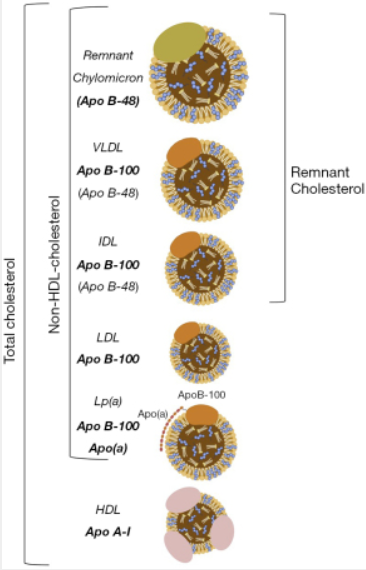
Remnant cholesterol is composed primarily of VLDL, IDL and chylomicron remnants

Remnant cholesterol, also known as remnant lipoprotein and triglyceride-rich lipoprotein cholesterol, is an atherogenic lipoprotein composed primarily of very low-density lipoprotein (VLDL) and intermediate-density lipoprotein (IDL) with chylomicron remnants. Elevated remnant cholesterol is associated with increased risk of atherosclerotic cardiovascular disease and stroke.

== Definition ==
Remnant cholesterol is the cholesterol content of triglyceride-rich lipoproteins, which consist of very low-density lipoproteins and intermediate-density lipoproteins with chylomicron remnants. Remnant cholesterol is primarily chylomicron and VLDL, and each remnant particle contains about 40 times more cholesterol than LDL.

Remnant cholesterol corresponds to all cholesterol not found in high-density lipoprotein (HDL-C) and low-density lipoprotein (LDL-C). It is calculated as total cholesterol minus HDL-C and LDL-C.

== Health effects ==
Elevated remnant cholesterol is associated with an increased risk of atherosclerotic cardiovascular disease, chronic inflammation, myocardial infarction and stroke. Remnant cholesterol is especially predictive of coronary artery disease in patients with normal total cholesterol.

High plasma remnant cholesterol is associated with increased plasma triglyceride levels. Hypertriglyceridemia is characteristic of high plasma remnant cholesterol, but persons with high plasma triglycerides without high remnant cholesterol rarely have coronary artery disease.

Remnant cholesterol has about twice the association with ischemic heart disease as LDL cholesterol. Although remnant cholesterol tends to be higher in people who are overweight (high body mass index), normal-weight persons with high remnant cholesterol tend to have a higher risk of myocardial infarction.

== Lowering remnant cholesterol ==
Vupanorsen, an ANGPTL3 inhibitor has been shown to lower remnant cholesterol up to 59%.

== See also ==
- Chylomicron remnant
- Lipid profile
