= Eötvös (disambiguation) =

Eötvös is a Hungarian surname.

Eötvös can also refer to:

- Eötvös (crater), on the Moon
- Eotvos (unit), a unit of gravitational gradient
- Eötvös effect, a concept in geodesy
- Eötvös experiment, an experiment determining the correlation between gravitational and inertial mass
- Eötvös number, a concept in fluid dynamics
- Eötvös rule, for predicting surface tension dependent on temperature
