= Hepatic lipase =

Mammalian protein found in humans

LIPC
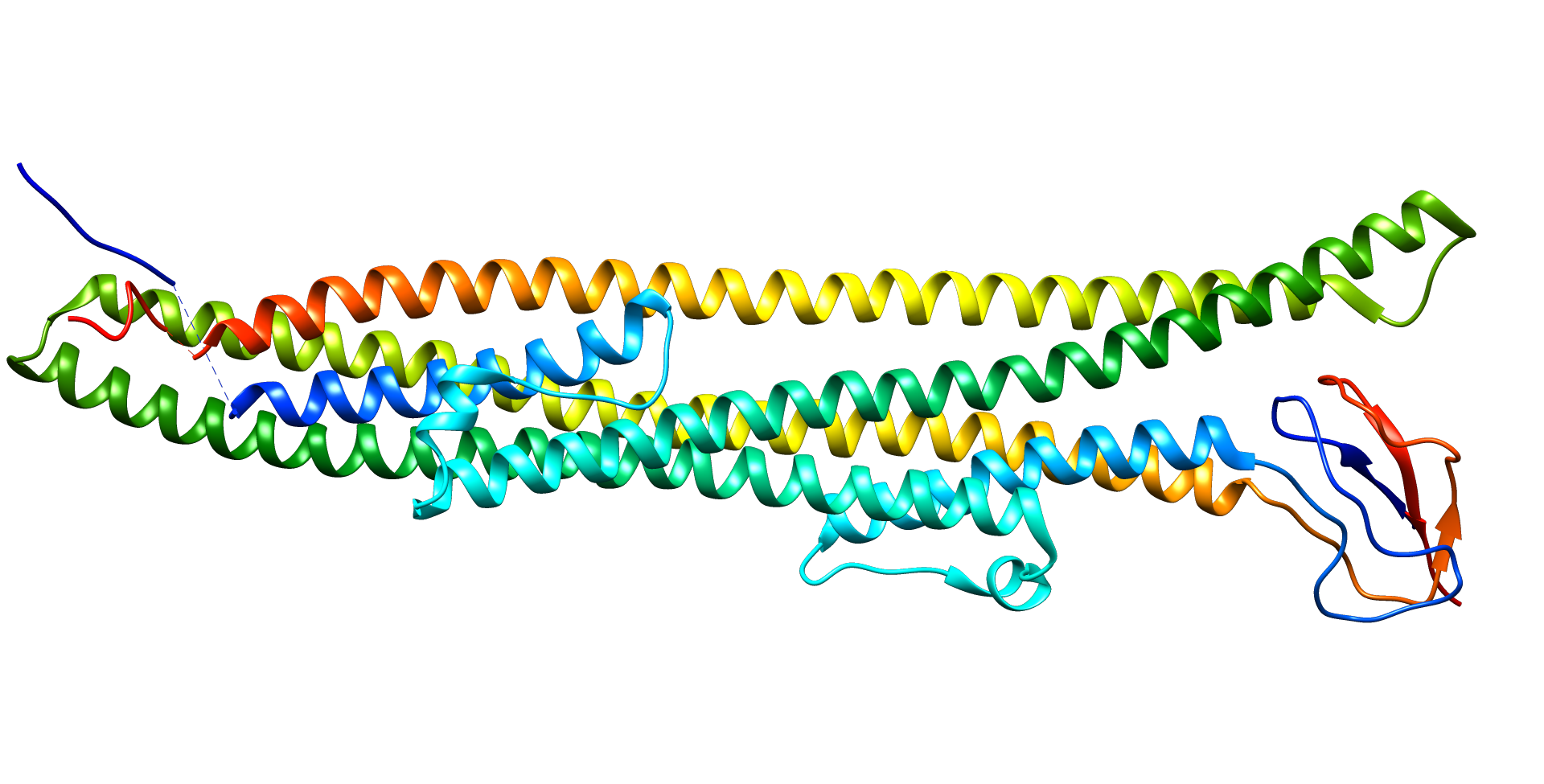

Identifiers
- Aliases: LIPC, HDLCQ12, HL, HTGL, LIPH, lipase C, hepatic type
- External IDs: OMIM: 151670; MGI: 96216; GeneCards: LIPC
Available structures
PDB	Ortholog search: PDBe RCSB
PDB	List of PDB id codes 5NEN
Enzyme activity
EC #	BRENDA	ExPASy	KEGG	MetaCyc
3.1.1.3	↗	↗	↗	↗
3.1.1.5	↗	↗	↗	↗
3.1.1.32	↗	↗	↗	↗

Gene location (Human)
Chr.	Chromosome 15 (human)
Band	15q21.3	Start	58,410,569 bp
Band	15q21.3	End	58,569,844 bp

Gene location (Mouse)
Chr.	Chromosome 9 (mouse)
Band	9 D|9 39.57 cM	Start	70,705,410 bp
Band	9 D|9 39.57 cM	End	70,859,508 bp
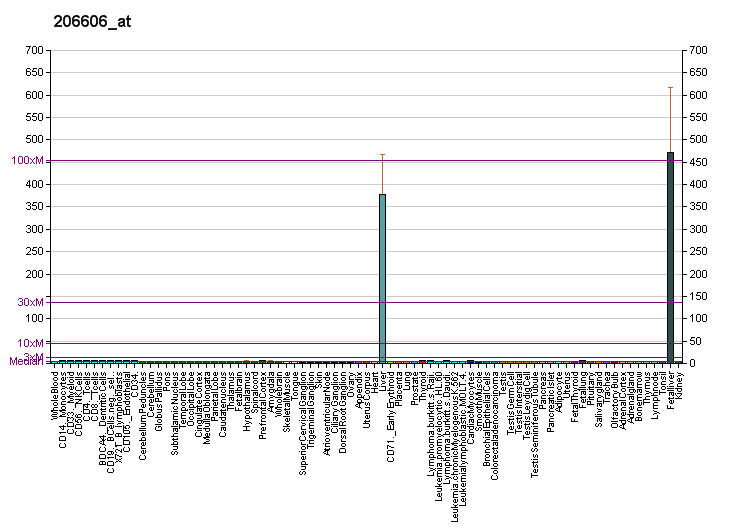
RNA expression pattern
Bgee	Human / Mouse (ortholog); Top expressed in: right lobe of liver; epithelium of colon; tibial nerve; testicle; monocyte; sural nerve; human kidney; islet of Langerhans; C1 segment; mucosa of transverse colon / Top expressed in: left lobe of liver; gallbladder; superior surface of tongue; femur; body of femur; yolk sac; calvaria; embryo; fossa; sexually immature organism; More reference expression data
BioGPS	More reference expression data
Gene ontology
Molecular function	heparin binding; lipase activity; triglyceride lipase activity; phospholipase activity; carboxylic ester hydrolase activity; hydrolase activity; low-density lipoprotein particle binding; apolipoprotein binding; lipoprotein lipase activity
Cellular component	endoplasmic reticulum lumen; extracellular region; high-density lipoprotein particle; extracellular space
Biological process	phosphatidylcholine catabolic process; lipid metabolism; cholesterol transport; cholesterol metabolic process; intermediate-density lipoprotein particle remodeling; triglyceride catabolic process; lipid catabolic process; fatty acid biosynthetic process; cholesterol homeostasis; triglyceride homeostasis; reverse cholesterol transport; low-density lipoprotein particle remodeling; chylomicron remnant clearance; very-low-density lipoprotein particle remodeling; high-density lipoprotein particle remodeling; regulation of lipoprotein lipase activity
Sources:Amigo / QuickGO
Orthologs
Databases	NCBI: entry; OMA: entry
Species	Human	Mouse
Entrez	3990	15450
Ensembl	ENSG00000166035	ENSMUSG00000032207
UniProt	P11150	P27656
RefSeq (mRNA)	NM_000236	NM_008280; NM_001324472; NM_001324473
RefSeq (protein)	NP_000227	NP_001311401; NP_001311402; NP_032306
Location (UCSC)	Chr 15: 58.41 – 58.57 Mb	Chr 9: 70.71 – 70.86 Mb
PubMed search
- Wikidata
View/Edit Human	View/Edit Mouse

Hepatic lipase (HL), also called hepatic triglyceride lipase (HTGL) or LIPC (for "lipase, hepatic"), is a form of lipase, catalyzing the hydrolysis of triacylglyceride. Hepatic lipase is coded by chromosome 15 and its gene is also often referred to as HTGL or LIPC. Hepatic lipase is expressed mainly in liver cells, known as hepatocytes, and endothelial cells of the liver. The hepatic lipase can either remain attached to the liver or can unbind from the liver endothelial cells and is free to enter the body's circulation system. When bound on the endothelial cells of the liver, it is often found bound to heparan sulfate proteoglycans (HSPG), keeping HL inactive and unable to bind to HDL (high-density lipoprotein) or IDL (intermediate-density lipoprotein). When it is free in the bloodstream, however, it is found associated with HDL to maintain it inactive. This is because the triacylglycerides in HDL serve as a substrate, but the lipoprotein contains proteins around the triacylglycerides that can prevent the triacylglycerides from being broken down by HL.

One of the principal functions of hepatic lipase is to convert intermediate-density lipoprotein (IDL) to low-density lipoprotein (LDL). Hepatic lipase thus plays an important role in triglyceride level regulation in the blood by maintaining steady levels of IDL, HDL and LDL.

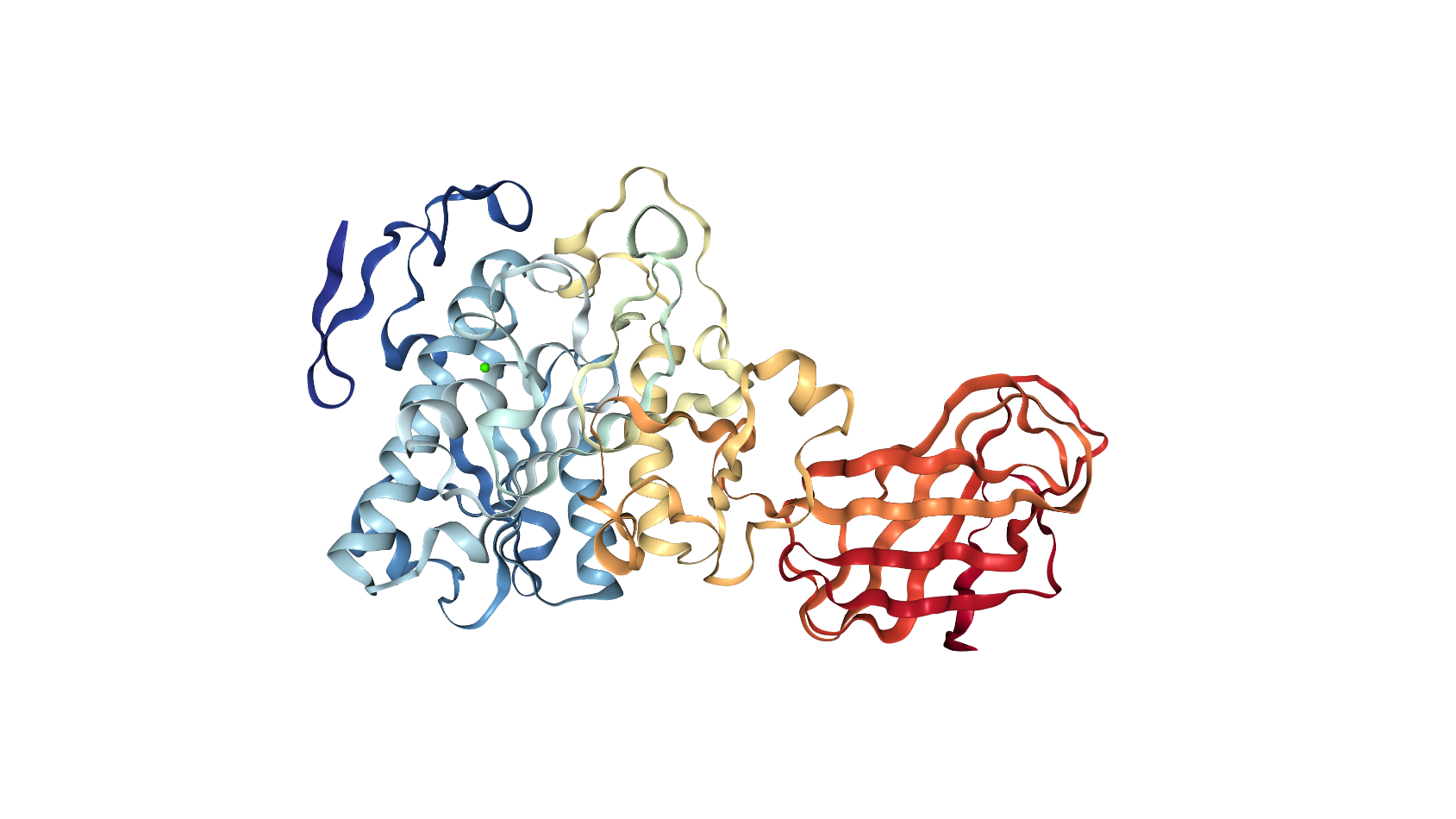
Horse pancreatic lipase, believed to have a similar structure to Homo sapiens hepatic lipase as both show similar amino acid sequences

== Function ==
Hepatic lipase falls under a class of enzymes known as hydrolases. Its function is to hydrolyze triacylglycerol to diacylglycerol and carboxylate (free fatty acids) with the addition of water. The substrate, triacylglycerol, comes from IDL (intermediate-density lipoprotein) and the release of free fatty acids converts IDL into LDL (low-density lipoprotein). These remaining remnants of LDL can be sent back to the liver, where it can be stored for later use or broken down to harness its energy. It can also be sent to peripheral cells for its cholesterol and used in anabolic pathways to build molecules that the cell needs such as hormones that include a cholesterol backbone.

To prevent the build-up of plaque (also referred to as a lipid pool), nascent HDL molecules which are low in triglycerides, take off free fatty acids from the plaques through the help of ABCL1 proteins. These proteins help transfer free fatty acids from plaques in the arteries to HDL. This process creates HDL3 (High density lipoprotein 3), a mature HDL molecule that has been esterified by another enzyme known as LCAT. More free fatty acids can be taken up from the plaque by SR-B1 receptors, which convert HDL3 to HDL2 which contains higher concentrations of free fatty acids. HDL2 can then interact with LDL and IDL by transferring over fatty acids that have accumulated in the plaque. Hepatic lipase can then catalyze the conversion of IDL to LDL by breaking down triacylglycerides in IDL and release free fatty acids to be used by other cells with low concentrations of cholesterol or stored in the liver for later use.

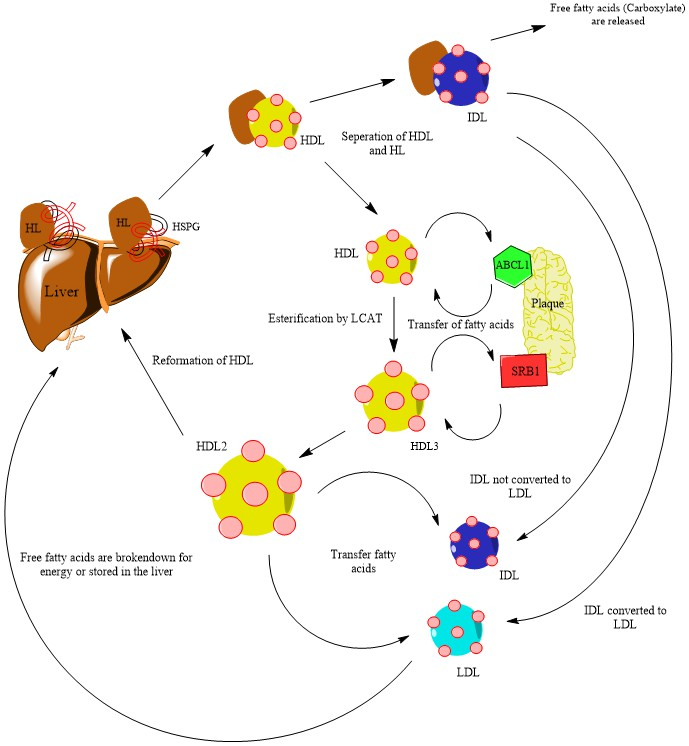
The function of hepatic lipase in regulating the formation and degradation of plaque (lipid pools) in the arteries of an organism. Note that ABCL1 protein, by transferring fatty acids from the plaque to HDL, creates HDL3. The same process is followed by SRB1, converting HDL3 to HDL2.

== Regulation ==
The human body contains two inactive forms of HL. One inactive form is found on the liver bound to HSPG (heparin sulfate proteoglycans) and the second inactive form is found in the blood bound to HDL, inactivated by the proteins on the surface of the lipoprotein. The activation of HL occurs in two steps. First, HDL that makes its way to the liver, binds to HL thereby removing the heparan sulfate proteoglycan and freeing up the hepatic lipase into the bloodstream, but HL is still inactive due to the proteins on the surface of the lipoprotein. Second, HDL unbinds from HL to activate HL enzymes in the blood.

HDL has been found to be regulated by electrostatic interactions with lipoproteins such as HDL. When HDL takes up free fatty acids from cells to prevent plaque build-up, it begins to increase its overall negative charge and instead stimulates HL to catalysis the triacylglycerides inside of VLDL (very low density lipoprotein). This is because the build-up of negative charge in HDL inhibits binding, but will allow HL to catalyze other lipoproteins. Other lipoproteins, such as ApoE, works in a similar way by inhibiting binding of HL and HDL but will allow HL to catalyze other lipoproteins.

Other factors that contribute the regulation of HL are due to sex differences between women and men. It has been shown that women contain lower levels of ApoE along with an increased amount of free HL enzymes in their circulatory system when compared to men. The production of estrogen in women is also believed to reduce the activity of HL by serving as an inhibitor of gene transcription.

Secretion of HDL from the liver into the circulatory system regulates the release of HL into the body's bloodstream. This is because factors that increase the release of HDL (such as fasting, leading to low levels of HDL) increases the amount of HL bound to HDL and released into the bloodstream. Another lipoprotein, ApoA-I, which increases release of HDL was shown to have a similar effect by mutating the gene that coded it. Mutated ApoA-I protein caused a decrease in HL release and thus decreased the amount of HL bound to HDL and released into the bloodstream.

== Clinical significance ==
Hepatic lipase deficiency is a rare, autosomal recessive disorder that results in elevated high-density lipoprotein (HDL) cholesterol due to a mutation in the hepatic lipase gene. Clinical features are not well understood and there are no characteristic xanthomas. There is an association with a delay in atherosclerosis in an animal model. Five missense mutations in encoding exons have been described and proved to be responsible for hepatic lipase deficiency: S267F, T383M, L334F, A174T, and R186H.

In many studies that have been conducted, hepatic lipase is also closely related to obesity. In one test, an experiment was created by Cedó et al. where mouse cells were created to have a mutated HL protein that has lost its function. They found that a build-up of triglyceride levels led to nonalcoholic fatty liver disease. This was due to HL's inability to convert the triacylglycerides in IDL, and thereby creating LDL. Thus, the inability of endothelial cells to take up free fatty acids becomes higher and more IDL gets stored in the liver. This deficiency in HL also leads to liver inflammation and obesity problems. In the experiment though, mouse HL is found unbound to heparan sulfate proteoglycans (HSPG) whereas human HL is found attached to heparan sulfate proteoglycans (HSPG), deactivating HL until bound to IDL. More experiments must be performed to determine the potential effects in humans.
