= Eötvös =

- Pronunciation: Hungarian: [ˈøtvøʃ]

Origin
- Language: Hungarian
- Meaning: silversmith, goldsmith, etc.
- Region of origin: Hungarian-speaking area (primary Hungary)

Other names
- Variant forms: Faber, Fabri, Fabricius; Goldschmidt (German: Goldschmied), Polish: Złotnik, Hebrew: צורף tzôrēf

Eötvös is a Hungarian surname. It is derived from an old spelling of the Hungarian word ötvös, meaning "gold- and silversmith".

People with the surname Eötvös include:

- József Eötvös (1813–1871), Hungarian statesman and author
- József Eötvös (musician) (born 1962) Hungarian guitar player
- Loránd Eötvös (1848–1919), Hungarian physicist
- Melody Eötvös (born 1984). Australian composer
- Péter Eötvös (1944–2024), Hungarian composer and conductor
- Zoltán Eötvös (1891–1936), Hungarian speed skater

People with names that are variant spellings of Eötvös include

- A. Dorian Otvos (1893–1945), American writer and composer
- Jim Otvos, American biochemist
- Ö. Fülöp Beck (Hungarian: Beck Ötvös Fülöp; 1873–1945), Hungarian sculptor, medal maker

== See also ==
- List of titled noble families in the Kingdom of Hungary
