= Low-density lipoprotein =

One of the five major groups of lipoprotein

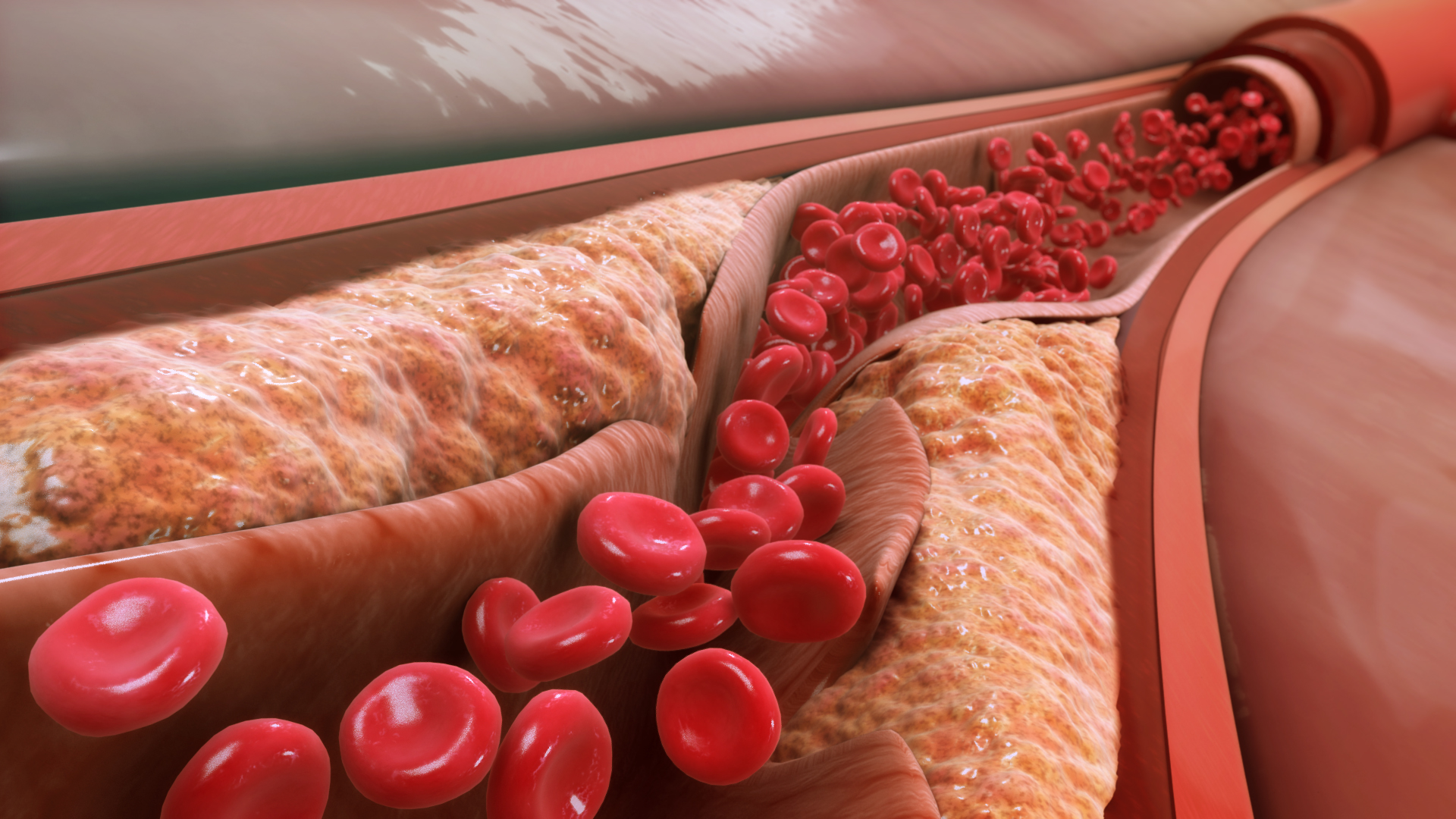
- Elevated LDL may result in atherosclerosis
Conversion calculator
SI (mmol/L)	Conventional (mg/dL)

Low-density lipoprotein (LDL) is one of the five major groups of lipoprotein that transport all fat molecules around the body in extracellular water. These groups, from least dense to most dense, are chylomicrons (aka ULDL by the overall density naming convention), very low-density lipoprotein (VLDL), intermediate-density lipoprotein (IDL), low-density lipoprotein (LDL) and high-density lipoprotein (HDL). LDL delivers fat molecules to cells.

Lipoproteins transfer lipids (fats) around the body in the extracellular fluid, making fats available to body cells for receptor-mediated endocytosis. Lipoproteins are complex particles composed of multiple proteins, typically 80–100 proteins per particle (organized by a single apolipoprotein B for LDL and the larger particles). A single LDL particle is about 22–27.5 nanometers in diameter, typically transporting 3,000 to 6,000 fat molecules per particle and varying in size according to the number and mix of fat molecules contained within. The lipids carried include all fat molecules with cholesterol, phospholipids, and triglycerides dominant; amounts of each vary considerably.

Elevated LDL is an established causal factor for the development of atherosclerotic cardiovascular disease. A normal non-atherogenic LDL-C level is 20–40 mg/dl. Guidelines recommend maintaining LDL-C under 2.6 mmol/L (100 mg/dl) and under 1.8 mmol/L (70 mg/dL) for those at high risk.

== Biochemistry ==
=== Structure ===
Each native LDL particle enables emulsification, i.e. surrounding the fatty acids being carried, enabling these fats to move around the body within the water outside cells. Each particle contains a single apolipoprotein B-100 molecule (Apo B-100, a protein that has 4536 amino acid residues and a mass of 514 kDa), along with 80 to 100 additional ancillary proteins. Each LDL has a highly hydrophobic core consisting of polyunsaturated fatty acid known as linoleate and hundreds to thousands (about 1500 commonly cited as an average) of esterified and unesterified cholesterol molecules. This core also carries varying numbers of triglycerides and other fats and is surrounded by a shell of phospholipids and unesterified cholesterol, as well as the single copy of Apo B-100. LDL particles are approximately 22 nm (0.00000087 in.) to 27.5 nm in diameter and have a mass of about 3 million daltons. Since LDL particles contain a variable and changing number of fatty acid molecules, there is a distribution of LDL particle mass and size. Determining the structure of LDL has been difficult for biochemists because of its heterogeneous structure. However, the structure of LDL at human body temperature in native condition, with a resolution of about 16 Angstroms using cryogenic electron microscopy, has been described in 2011.

== Physiology ==
LDL particles are formed when triglycerides are removed from VLDL by the lipoprotein lipase enzyme (LPL), and they become smaller and denser (i.e., fewer fat molecules with the same protein transport shell), containing a higher proportion of cholesterol esters.

=== Transport into the cell ===
When a cell requires more cholesterol than its HMG-CoA pathway can produce, it synthesizes the necessary LDL receptors as well as PCSK9, a proprotein convertase that marks the LDL receptor for degradation. LDL receptors are inserted into the plasma membrane and diffuse freely until they associate with clathrin-coated pits. When LDL receptors bind LDL particles in the bloodstream, the clathrin-coated pits are endocytosed into the cell.

Vesicles containing LDL receptors bound to LDL are delivered to the endosomes. In the presence of low pH, such as that found in the endosome, LDL receptors undergo a conformation change, releasing LDL. LDL is then shipped to the lysosomes, where cholesterol esters in the LDL are hydrolysed. LDL receptors are typically returned to the plasma membrane, where they repeat this cycle. If LDL receptors bind to PCSK9, however, transport of LDL receptors is redirected to the lysosome, where they are degraded.

=== Innate immune system ===
LDL interferes with the quorum sensing system that upregulates genes required for invasive Staphylococcus aureus infection. The mechanism of antagonism entails binding apolipoprotein B to a S. aureus autoinducer pheromone, preventing signaling through its receptor. Mice deficient in apolipoprotein B are more susceptible to invasive bacterial infection.

=== Size patterns ===
LDL can be grouped based on its size: large low-density LDL particles are described as pattern A, and small high-density ("small dense") LDL particles are pattern B. Pattern B has been associated by some with a higher risk for coronary artery disease. This is thought to be because the smaller particles are more easily able to penetrate the endothelium of arterial walls. Pattern I, or intermediate, indicates that most LDL particles are very close in size to the normal gaps in the endothelium (26 nm). According to one study, sizes 19.0–20.5 nm were designated as pattern B and LDL sizes 20.6–22 nm were designated as pattern A.

Some evidence suggests the correlation between pattern B and coronary artery disease is stronger than the correspondence between the LDL number measured in the standard lipid profile test. Tests to measure these LDL subtype patterns have been more expensive and not widely available, so the standard lipid profile test is used more often.

There has also been noted a correspondence between higher triglyceride levels and higher levels of smaller, denser LDL particles and alternately lower triglyceride levels and higher levels of the larger, less dense ("buoyant") LDL.

With continued research, decreasing cost, greater availability, and wider acceptance of other lipoprotein subclass analysis assay methods, including NMR spectroscopy, research studies have shown a stronger correlation between clinically evident human cardiovascular events and quantitatively measured particle concentrations.

=== Oxidized ===
Oxidized LDL (oxLDL) is a general term for LDL particles with oxidatively modified structural components. As a result, from free radical attack, both lipid and protein parts of LDL can be oxidized in the vascular wall. Besides the oxidative reactions in the vascular wall, oxidized lipids in LDL can also be derived from oxidized dietary lipids. Oxidized LDL is known to associate with the development of atherosclerosis, and it is therefore widely studied as a potential risk factor of cardiovascular diseases. Atherogenicity of oxidized LDL has been explained by lack of recognition of oxidation-modified LDL structures by the LDL receptors, preventing the normal metabolism of LDL particles and leading eventually to the development of atherosclerotic plaques. Of the lipid material contained in LDL, various lipid oxidation products are known as the ultimate atherogenic species. Acting as a transporter of these injurious molecules is another mechanism by which LDL can increase the risk of atherosclerosis.

The LOX-1 scavenge receptor does take up oxLDL, but the liver does not naturally express it. It is instead expressed by endothelial cells, platelets, macrophages, smooth muscle cells, and cardiomyocytes as an innate immune scavenge receptor. When activated, pro-inflammatory signals are generated in the cell, and damaging compounds are released as well. As a result, these cells are most sensitive to the effects of oxLDL. SR-BI and CD36, two class B scavenge receptors, also take up oxLDL into the macrophage.

Despite lower recognition efficacy by the LDL receptor, the liver does remove oxLDLs from the circulation. This is achieved by Kupffer cells and liver sinusoidal endothelial cells (LSECs). In LSECs, stabilin-1 and stabilin-2 mediate most of the uptake. Uptake of oxLDLs causes visible disruption to the structure of the LSEC in rats. Doing the same also damages human LSEC cultures.

=== Acetyl ===
Acetyl LDL (acLDL) is a construct generated in vitro. When scientists produced such a modified version of LDL, they found that a class of scavenge receptors, now called SR-A, can recognize them and take them up. Because scavenge receptors work much faster than the downregulated native LDL receptor of a macrophage, oxLDL and acLDL can both fill up a macrophage quickly, turning it into a foam cell.

== Testing ==
Blood tests commonly report LDL-C: the amount of cholesterol that is estimated to be contained with LDL particles, on average, using a formula, the Friedewald equation. In a clinical context, mathematically calculated estimates of LDL-C are commonly used to estimate how much low-density lipoproteins drive the progression of atherosclerosis. The problem with this approach is that LDL-C values are commonly discordant with both direct measurements of LDL particles and actual rates of atherosclerosis progression.

Direct LDL measurements are also available and better reveal individual issues but are less often promoted or done due to slightly higher costs and are available from only a couple of laboratories in the United States. In 2008, the American Diabetes Association (ADA) and American College of Cardiology (ACC) recognized direct LDL particle measurement by NMR as superior for assessing individual risk of cardiovascular events.

=== Estimation of LDL particles via cholesterol content ===
Chemical measures of lipid concentration have long been the most-used clinical measurement, not because they have the best correlation with individual outcomes but because these lab methods are less expensive and more widely available.

The lipid profile does not measure LDL particles. It only estimates them using the Friedewald equation by subtracting the amount of cholesterol associated with other particles, such as HDL and VLDL, assuming a prolonged fasting state, etc.:

$$L \approx C - H - kT$$

where H is HDL cholesterol, L is LDL cholesterol, C is total cholesterol, T is triglycerides, and k is 0.20 if the quantities are measured in mg/dL and 0.45 in mmol/L.

L is often reported as CLDL-C (calculated low-density lipoprotein cholesterol). This is the most common way of estimating the amount of cholesterol carried by low-density lipoprotein.

There are limitations to this method, most notably that samples must be obtained after a 12 to 14 h fast and that LDL-C cannot be calculated if plasma triglyceride is > 4.52 mmol/L (400 mg/dL). Even at triglyceride levels of 2.5 to 4.5 mmol/L, this formula is considered inaccurate. If both total cholesterol and triglyceride levels are elevated then a modified formula, with quantities in mg/dL, may be used

$$L = C - H - 0.16T$$

This formula provides an approximation with fair accuracy for most people, assuming the blood was drawn after fasting for about 14 hours or longer, but does not reveal the actual LDL particle concentration because the percentage of fat molecules within the LDL particles, which are cholesterol, varies as much as 8:1 variation. There are several formulas published addressing the inaccuracy in LDL-C estimation. The inaccuracy is based on the assumption that VLDL-C (very low density lipoprotein cholesterol) is always one-fifth of the triglyceride concentration. Other formulae address this issue by using an adjustable factor or using a regression equation. There are few studies which have compared the LDL-C values derived from this formula and values obtained by direct enzymatic method. Direct enzymatic methods are found to be accurate and must be the test of choice in clinical situations. In resource-poor settings, the option to use the formula has to be considered.

However, the concentration of LDL particles, and to a lesser extent, their size, has a stronger and consistent correlation with individual clinical outcomes than the amount of cholesterol within LDL particles, even if the LDL-C estimation is approximately correct. There is increasing evidence and recognition of the value of more targeted and accurate measurements of LDL particles. Specifically, LDL particle number (concentration) and, to a lesser extent, size have shown slightly stronger correlations with atherosclerotic progression and cardiovascular events than obtained using chemical measures of the amount of cholesterol carried by the LDL particles. It is possible that the LDL cholesterol concentration can be low, yet LDL particle number high and cardiovascular events rates are high. Correspondingly, it is possible that LDL cholesterol concentration can be relatively high, yet LDL particle number is low, and cardiovascular events are also low.

==== Normal ranges ====
In the US, the American Heart Association, National Institutes of Health (NIH), and National Cholesterol Education Program (NCEP) provide a set of guidelines for fasting LDL-cholesterol levels, estimated or measured, and risk for heart disease. As of about 2005, these guidelines were:

Level mg/dL	Level mmol/L	Interpretation
25 to <50	<1.3	Optimal LDL cholesterol levels in healthy young children before onset of atherosclerotic plaque in heart artery walls
<70	<1.8	Optimal LDL cholesterol, corresponding to lower rates of progression, is promoted as a target option for those known to have advanced symptomatic cardiovascular disease clearly
<100	<2.6	Optimal LDL cholesterol, corresponding to lower, but not zero, rates for symptomatic cardiovascular disease events
100 to 129	2.6 to 3.3	Near-optimal LDL level, corresponding to higher rates of developing symptomatic cardiovascular disease events
130 to 159	3.3 to 4.1	Borderline high LDL level, corresponding to even higher rates for developing symptomatic cardiovascular disease events
160 to 199	4.1 to 4.9	High LDL level, corresponding to much higher rates for developing symptomatic cardiovascular disease events
>200	>4.9	Very high LDL level, corresponding to the highest increased rates of symptomatic cardiovascular disease events

Over time, with more clinical research, these recommended levels keep being reduced because LDL reduction, including to abnormally low levels, was the most effective strategy for reducing cardiovascular death rates in one large double blind, randomized clinical trial of men with hypercholesterolemia; far more effective than coronary angioplasty/stenting or bypass surgery.

The 2004 updated American Heart Association, NIH, and NCEP recommendations for people with known atherosclerosis diseases are for lowering LDL levels to less than 70 mg/dL. This low level of less than 70 mg/dL was recommended for primary prevention of 'very-high risk patients' and secondary prevention as a 'reasonable further reduction'. This position was disputed. Statin drugs involved in such clinical trials have numerous physiological effects beyond simply the reduction of LDL levels.

From longitudinal population studies following the progression of atherosclerosis-related behaviors from early childhood into adulthood, the usual LDL in childhood, before the development of fatty streaks, is about 35 mg/dL. However, all the above values refer to chemical measures of lipid/cholesterol concentration within LDL, not measured low-density lipoprotein concentrations, which is the accurate approach.

A study was conducted measuring the effects of guideline changes on LDL cholesterol reporting and control for diabetes visits in the US from 1995 to 2004. It was found that although LDL cholesterol reporting and control for diabetes and coronary heart disease visits improved continuously between 1995 and 2004, neither the 1998 ADA guidelines nor the 2001 ATP III guidelines increased LDL cholesterol control for diabetes relative to coronary heart disease.

=== Direct measurement of LDL particle concentrations ===
There are several competing methods for measuring lipoprotein particle concentrations and size. The evidence is that the NMR methodology (developed, automated and significantly reduced in costs while improving accuracy as pioneered by Jim Otvos and associates) results in a 22-25% reduction in cardiovascular events within one year, contrary to the longstanding claims by many in the medical industry that the superiority over existing methods was weak, even by statements of some proponents.

Since the later 1990s, because of the development of NMR measurements, it has been possible to clinically measure lipoprotein particles at lower cost [under $80 US (including shipping) and is decreasing versus the previous costs of >$400 to >$5,000] and higher accuracy. There are two other assays for LDL particles; however, most estimate only LDL particle concentrations like LDL-C.

The ADA and ACC mentioned direct LDL particle measurement by NMR in a 28 March 2008 joint consensus statement, as having advantages for predicting individual risk of atherosclerosis disease events, but the statement noted that the test is less widely available, is more expensive [about $13.00 US (2015 without insurance coverage) from some labs which use the Vantera Analyzer]. Debate continues that it is "...unclear whether LDL particle size measurements add value to the measurement of LDL-particle concentration", though outcomes have continuously tracked LDL particle, not LDL-C, concentrations.

Using NMR, the total LDL particle concentrations in nmol/L plasma are typically subdivided by percentiles referenced to the 5,382 men and women participating in the MESA trial who are not on any lipid medications.

LDL particle concentration can also be measured by measuring the concentration of the protein ApoB, based on the generally accepted principle that each LDL or VLDL particle carries one ApoB molecule.

==== Optimal ranges ====
The LDL particle concentrations are typically categorized by percentiles, <20%, 20–50%, 50th–80th%, 80th–95%, and >95% groups of the people participating and being tracked in the MESA trial, a medical research study sponsored by the United States National Heart, Lung, and Blood Institute.

MESA Percentile	LDL particles nmol/L	Interpretation
0–20%	<1,000	Those with the lowest rate of cardiovascular disease events and low (optimal) LDL particle concentration
20–50%	1,000–1,299	Those with a moderate rate of cardiovascular disease events and moderate LDL particle concentration
50–80%	1,300–1,599	Those with borderline-high rates of cardiovascular disease events and higher LDL particle concentration
89–95%	1,600–2,000	Those with a high rate of cardiovascular disease events and even higher LDL particle concentration
>95%	>2,000	Those with a very high rate of cardiovascular disease events and the highest LDL particle concentration

Over time, the lowest incidence of atherosclerotic events occurs within the <20% group, with increased rates for the higher groups. Multiple other measures, including particle sizes, small LDL particle concentrations, large total and HDL particle concentrations, along with estimations of insulin resistance pattern and standard cholesterol lipid measurements (for comparison of the plasma data with the estimation methods discussed above) are also routinely provided.

== Lowering LDL-cholesterol ==
Markers indicating a need for LDL-C Reduction (Per 2004 United States Government Minimum Guidelines)
If the patient's cardiac risk is...	then the patient should consider LDL-C reduction if the count in mg/dL is over...	and LDL-C reduction is indicated if the count in mg/dL is over...
High, meaning a 20% or greater risk of heart attack within 10 years or an extreme risk factor	70	100
moderately high, meaning a 10-20% risk of heart attack within 10 years and more than 2 heart attack risk factors	100	130
moderate, meaning a 10% risk of heart attack within 10 years and more than 2 heart attack risk factors	130	160
low, meaning less than 10% risk of heart attack within 10 years and 1 or 0 heart attack risk factors	160	190

The mevalonate pathway serves as the basis for the biosynthesis of many molecules, including cholesterol. The enzyme 3-hydroxy-3-methylglutaryl coenzyme A reductase (HMG CoA reductase) is an essential component and performs the first of 37 steps within the cholesterol production pathway, and is present in every animal cell. Statins block this first step.

LDL-C is not a count of actual LDL particles. LDL-C represents how much cholesterol is being transported by all LDL particles, which is either a smaller concentration of large particles or a high concentration of small particles. LDL-C itself can be estimated by subtraction (Friedewald's method) or directly measured; see the section Testing above to see how it's measured. LDL particles carry many lipid molecules (typically 3,000 to 6,000 lipid molecules per LDL particle); this includes cholesterol, triglycerides, phospholipids and others. An LDL-C measurement cannot account for differences in size and composition between types of LDL.

=== Pharmaceutical ===
- PCSK9 inhibitors, in clinical trials, by several companies, are more effective for LDL reduction than the statins, including statins alone at high dose (though not necessarily the combination of statins plus ezetimibe). They have been approved and are recommended in patients not receiving enough reduction from their maximally tolerated dose of statins + ezetimibe.
- Statins reduce high levels of LDL particles by inhibiting the enzyme HMG-CoA reductase in cells, the rate-limiting step of cholesterol synthesis. To compensate for the decreased cholesterol availability, synthesis of LDL receptors (including hepatic) is increased, resulting in an increased clearance of LDL particles from the extracellular water, including of the blood.
- Ezetimibe reduces intestinal absorption of cholesterol, thus can reduce LDL particle concentrations when combined with statins.
- Niacin (nicotinic acid), lowers LDL by selectively inhibiting hepatic diacylglycerol acyltransferase 2, reducing triglyceride synthesis and VLDL secretion through a receptor HM74 and HM74A or GPR109A. Introduced in 1955.
- Clofibrate is effective at lowering cholesterol levels, but has been associated with significantly increased cancer and stroke mortality, despite lowered cholesterol levels. Other developed and tested fibrates, e.g. fenofibric acid have had a better track record and are primarily promoted for lowering VLDL particles (triglycerides), not LDL particles, yet can help some in combination with other strategies.
- Probucol, introduced in the 1970s. Now known to work through, among other ways, changing the shape and size of the LDL particle so they can be taken up by the liver without involving the LDL receptor. It has been discontinued in the west due to HDL-C decreases that were not explainable at the time. It's now known that it enhances the reverse cholesterol transport and antioxidant functions of HDL despite decreasing HDL-C.

==== Not approved as drugs ====
- Several CETP inhibitors have been researched to improve HDL concentrations, but so far, despite dramatically increasing HDL-C, have not had a consistent track record in reducing atherosclerosis disease events. Some have increased mortality rates compared with placebo.
- Some tocotrienols, especially delta- and gamma-tocotrienols, are being promoted as statin alternative non-prescription agents to treat high cholesterol, having been shown in vitro to have an effect. In particular, gamma-tocotrienol appears to be another HMG-CoA reductase inhibitor, and can reduce cholesterol production. As with statins, this decrease in intra-hepatic (liver) LDL levels may induce hepatic LDL receptor up-regulation, also decreasing plasma LDL levels. As always, a key issue is how benefits and complications of such agents compare with statins—molecular tools that have been analyzed in large numbers of human research and clinical trials since the mid-1970s.
- Phytosterols are widely recognized as having a proven LDL cholesterol lowering efficacy' A 2018 review found a dose-response relationship for phytosterols, with intakes of 1.5 to 3 g/day lowering LDL-C by 7.5% to 12%, but reviews as of 2017 had found no data indicating that the consumption of phytosterols may reduce the risk of CVD. Current supplemental guidelines for reducing LDL recommend doses of phytosterols in the 1.6-3.0 grams per day range (Health Canada, EFSA, ATP III, FDA) with a 2009 meta-analysis demonstrating an 8.8% reduction in LDL-cholesterol at a mean dose of 2.15 gram per day.

=== Lifestyle ===
LDL cholesterol can be lowered through dietary intervention by limiting foods with saturated fat and avoiding foods with trans fat. Saturated fats are found in meat products (including poultry), full-fat dairy, eggs, and refined tropical oils like coconut and palm. Added trans fat (in the form of partially hydrogenated oils) has been banned in 53 countries. However, trans fat can still be found in red meat and dairy products as it is produced in small amounts by ruminants such as sheep and cows. LDL cholesterol can also be lowered by increasing consumption of soluble fiber and plant-based foods. Canned baked beans, whole chickpeas, navy beans, pinto beans and peas decrease total and LDL cholesterol. Dietary therapy can typically lower LDL-C by 8% to 15%.

Another lifestyle approach to reduce LDL cholesterol has been minimizing total body fat, in particular fat stored inside the abdominal cavity (visceral body fat). Visceral fat, which is more metabolically active than subcutaneous fat, has been found to produce many enzymatic signals, e.g. resistin, which increase insulin resistance and circulating VLDL particle concentrations, thus both increasing LDL particle concentrations and accelerating the development of diabetes mellitus.

== See also ==
- Catechin – Plant secondary metabolite
- Cholesterol – Sterol biosynthesized by all animal cells
- Lysosomal acid lipase deficiency
- Cholesteryl ester storage disease
- Coenzyme Q10 – Biochemical cofactor and antioxidant
- Flavonoid – Class of plant and fungus secondary metabolites
- Glutathione – Ubiquitous antioxidant compound in living organisms
- Health effects of tea – Influence of tea consumption on health
- High density lipoprotein – One of the five major groups of lipoprotein
- LDL receptor – Mammalian protein found in Homo sapiens
- Lipid profile – Panel of blood tests
- Lipoprotein(a) – Low-density lipoprotein containing apolipoprotein(a)
- Lipoprotein-X – Abnormal low density lipoprotein found in cholestasis
- Melatonin – Hormone released by the pineal gland
- Polyphenol antioxidant – Hypothetical type of antioxidant
- Saturated fat – Fat in which the fatty acid chains have all or predominantly single bonds
- Stanol ester – Class of chemical compounds
- Sterol ester – Class of chemical compounds
- Triglyceride – Any ester of glycerol having all three hydroxyl groups esterified with fatty acids
- Vitamin A – Essential nutrient
- Vitamin C – Essential nutrient found in citrus fruits and other foods
- Vitamin E – Class of 8 chemically related vitamins
