= Lipid profile =

Panel of blood tests

- MeSH: -
- MedlinePlus: 003491
- eMedicine: -
- LOINC: 24331-1, 57698-3

A lipid profile or lipid panel is a panel of blood tests used to find abnormalities in blood lipid (such as cholesterol and triglycerides) concentrations. The results of this test can identify certain genetic diseases and can determine approximate risks for cardiovascular disease, certain forms of pancreatitis, and other diseases.

Lipid panels are usually ordered as part of a physical exam, along with other panels such as the complete blood count (CBC) and basic metabolic panel (BMP).

== Components ==
A lipid profile report typically includes:

- Low-density lipoprotein (LDL)
- High-density lipoprotein (HDL)
- Total triglycerides
- Total cholesterol

LDL is not usually actually measured, but calculated from the other three using the Friedewald equation. A laboratory can optionally calculate the two extra values from the report:

- Very low-density lipoprotein (VLDL)
- Cholesterol:HDL ratio

== Procedure and indication ==
Recommendations for cholesterol testing come from the Adult Treatment Panel (ATP) III guidelines, and are based on many large clinical studies, such as the Framingham Heart Study.

For healthy adults with no cardiovascular risk factors, the ATP III guidelines recommend screening once every five years. A lipid profile may also be ordered at regular intervals to evaluate the success of lipid-lowering drugs such as statins.

In the pediatric and adolescent population, lipid testing is not routinely performed. However, the American Academy of Pediatrics and the National Heart, Lung, and Blood Institute (NHLBI) recommend that children aged 9–11 be screened once for severe cholesterol abnormalities. This screening can be valuable to detect genetic diseases such as familial hypercholesterolemia that can be lethal if not treated early.

Traditionally, most laboratories have required patients to fast for 9–12 hours before screening. However, studies have questioned the utility of fasting before lipid panels, and some diagnostic labs routinely accept non-fasting samples.

== Methods ==
=== Friedewald ===
Typically the laboratory measures only three quantities: total cholesterol; HDL; Triglycerides. A typical procedure used by NHANES 2004 uses the following measurement methods:

- Total cholesterol is measured using a mixture of enzymes. First an esterase converts cholesterol esters into cholesterol and free fatty acid. Then an oxidase oxidizes the cholesterol, producing a H_{2}O_{2} side-product that changes the color of a dye. The amount of oxidation can be precisely quantified by light absorbance at 500 nm.
- Triglyceride concentration is also measured using an enzyme mixture. A lipase releases glycerol from the molecules, which gets oxidized by another enzyme while producing H_{2}O_{2}. The same color-change follows.
- HDL is measured in two steps. First a special reagent is added to the serum that binds apoB-containing lipoprotein particles, shielding them from the enzymes in the next step. Then a mixture of PEGylated enzymes is added with dye. The chemical reaction is the same as the total cholesterol measurement, except that the enzymes are blocked from acting on non-HDL lipoproteins by the reagent and their own PEG tails.

From these three data LDL may be calculated. According to Friedewald's equation:

- [LDL] = [Total cholesterol] − [HDL] − [Triglycerides] /5

Other calculations of LDL from those same three data have been proposed which yield some significantly different results.

VLDL can be defined as the total cholesterol that is neither HDL nor LDL. With that definition, Friedewald's equation yields:

- [VLDL] = [Triglycerides] /5

The alternative calculations mentioned above may yield significantly different values for VLDL.

The Friedewald method is reasonably reliable for the majority of patients, but is notably inaccurate in patients with hypertriglyceridemia (> 400 mg/dL or 4.5 mmol/L). It also underestimates LDL-C in patients with low LDL-C (< 25 mg/dL or 0.6 mmol/L). It does not take into account intermediate-density lipoprotein.

A "Martin/Hopkins" variation that takes into how triglycerides-to-VLDL ratio tends to vary with other parameters appears more reliable and accurate.

=== All-direct ===
Every part of the lipid panel can be measured directly using ultracentrifugation, which is the gold standard. This type of measurement involves no errors from estimation and can also measure IDL-C and Lp(a)-C levels. Fully direct measurement is more costly, however.

Laboratories may also use proprietary tests for "direct chemical LDL-C" which require no prior separation by centrifugation. These tests are not yet standardized in US and Europe and lack validation. A specific version of the test seems popular in Japan, however. A number of other LDL-C determination methods have been used in the past or have been proposed for future use.

== Implications ==
This test is used to identify dyslipidemia (various disturbances of cholesterol and triglyceride levels), many forms of which are recognized risk factors for cardiovascular disease and rarely pancreatitis.

A total cholesterol reading can be used to assess an individual's risk for heart disease; however, it should not be relied upon as the only indicator. The individual components that make up total cholesterol reading—LDL, HDL, and VLDL—are also important in measuring risk.

For instance, someone's total cholesterol may be high, but this may be due to very high HDL ("good cholesterol") cholesterol levels,—which can help prevent heart disease (the test is mainly concerned with high LDL, or "bad cholesterol" levels). So, while a high total cholesterol level may help give an indication that there is a problem with cholesterol levels, the components that make up total cholesterol should also be measured.
