= White (mutation) =

Sex-linked mutation

white
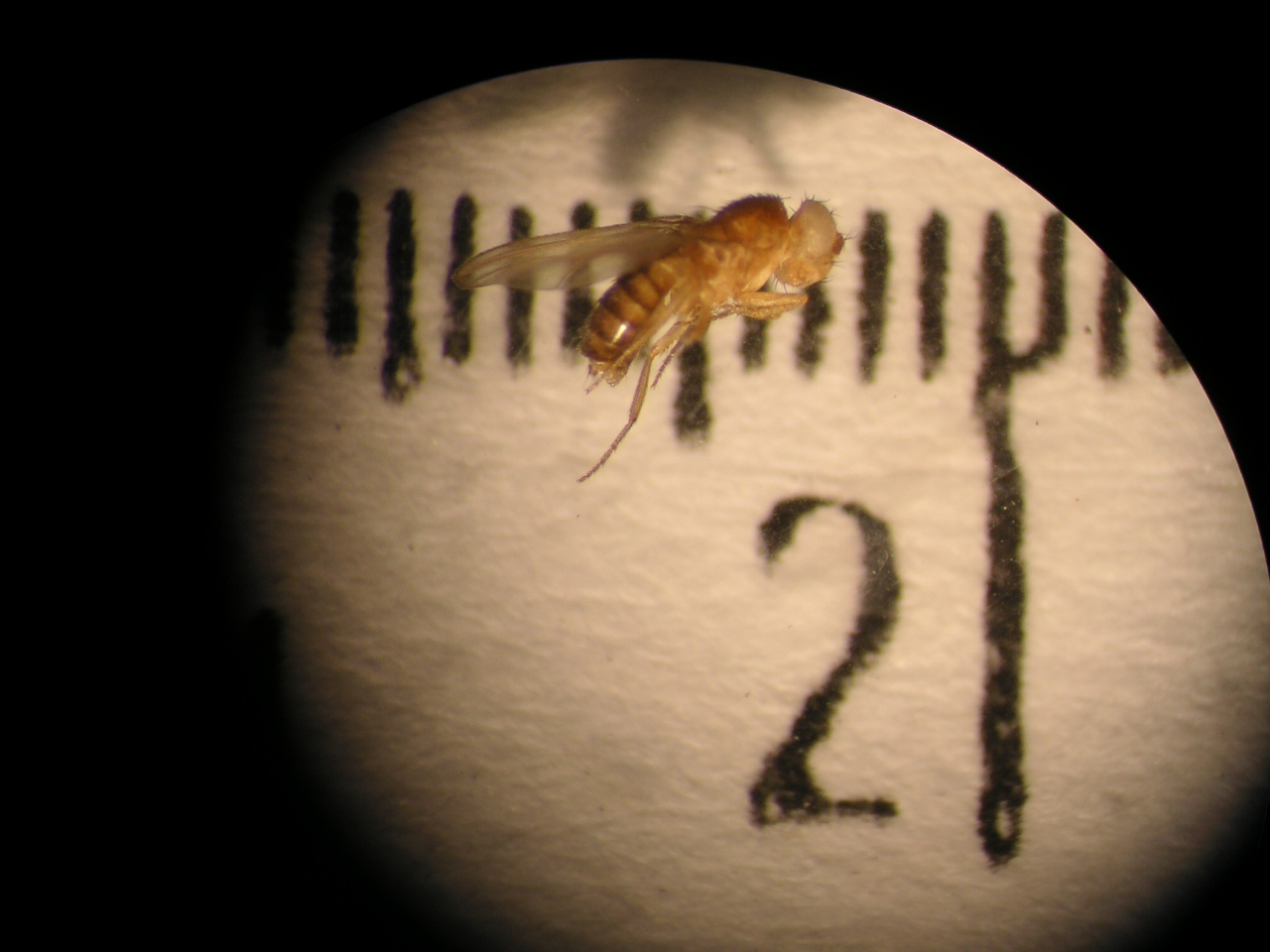
- A white-eyed Drosophila

Identifiers
- Organism: Drosophila melanogaster
- Symbol: w^{1}
- Orthologs: OMA: entry
- UniProt: P10090

Other data
- Chromosome: X: 2.79 - 2.8 Mb
Search for
- Structures: Swiss-model
- Domains: InterPro

white, abbreviated w, was the first sex-linked mutation discovered, found in the fruit fly Drosophila melanogaster. In 1910 Thomas Hunt Morgan and Lilian Vaughan Morgan collected a single male white-eyed mutant from a population of Drosophila melanogaster fruit flies, which usually have dark brick red compound eyes. Upon crossing this male with wild-type female flies, they found that the offspring did not conform to the expectations of Mendelian inheritance. The first generation (the F1) produced 1,237 red-eyed offspring and three white-eyed male flies. The second generation (the F2) produced 2,459 red-eyed females, 1,011 red-eyed males, and 782 white-eyed males. Further experimental crosses led them to the conclusion that this mutation was somehow physically connected to the "factor" that determined sex in Drosophila. This led to the discovery of sex linkage, in which the gene for a trait is found on a sex chromosome. Morgan named this trait white, now abbreviated w. Flies possessing the white allele are frequently used to introduce high school and university students to genetics.

Experimental cross performed by Thomas Hunt Morgan, illustrating the X-linked inheritance of white in Drosophila.

== Function ==
The protein coded by the white gene functions as an ATP-binding cassette (ABC) transporter. It carries the precursors of the red and brown eye color pigments, guanine and tryptophan, into the developing eyes during pupation. White-eyed flies are not blind; instead they are easily temporarily blinded by bright light at certain frequencies because they lack the protection provided by the red and brown pigments. The human version of white is ABCG1, and is involved in transporting lipids and cholesterol into cells.

== Effects mutation ==
Drosophila melanogaster with the white eye mutation typically have shorter life spans than wildtype Drosophila. They also experience many neurological deficiencies in addition to eye defects. Some of the deficiencies that they experience includes difficulty in mobility, and a low stress tolerance. Drosophila melanogaster with the white eye mutation often experience an increased sensitivity to light and a decrease in visual acuity. They have significantly less in the number of synaptic vesicles of photoreceptors.

White eye mutants of Drosophila melanogaster experience a lower rate of reproduction than their wildtype counterparts because they experience a reduced rate of sexual arousal during daylight. Ectopic expression of white+ induces male-male courtship in Drosophila. White+ controls the copulation success in Drosophila melanogaster.
