= Apolipoprotein C-II =

Protein-coding gene in the species Homo sapiens

APOC2
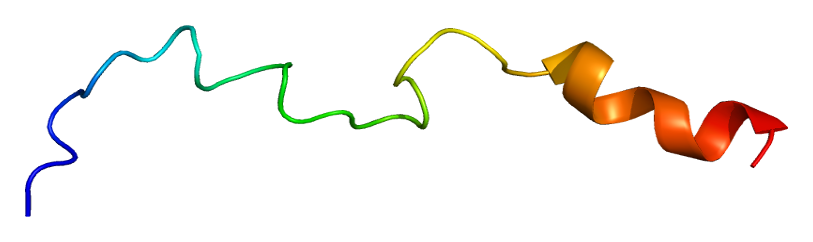

Identifiers
- Aliases: APOC2, APO-CII, APOC-II, apolipoprotein C2
- External IDs: OMIM: 608083; MGI: 88054; GeneCards: APOC2
Available structures
PDB	Ortholog search: PDBe RCSB
PDB	List of PDB id codes 1SOH, 1BY6, 1I5J, 1O8T

Gene location (Human)
Chr.	Chromosome 19 (human)
Band	19q13.32	Start	44,946,035 bp
Band	19q13.32	End	44,949,565 bp

Gene location (Mouse)
Chr.	Chromosome 7 (mouse)
Band	7 A3|7 9.94 cM	Start	19,405,504 bp
Band	7 A3|7 9.94 cM	End	19,411,866 bp
RNA expression pattern
Bgee	Human / Mouse (ortholog); Top expressed in: right lobe of liver; substantia nigra; C1 segment; duodenum; caudate nucleus; putamen; amygdala; testicle; nucleus accumbens; hypothalamus / Top expressed in: yolk sac; duodenum; liver; jejunum; ileum; spermatocyte; colon; granulocyte; pulmonary alveolus; wall of pulmonary alveolus; More reference expression data
BioGPS	n/a
Gene ontology
Molecular function	lipase inhibitor activity; phospholipase binding; protein homodimerization activity; lipoprotein lipase activator activity; phospholipase activator activity; enzyme activator activity; lipid binding
Cellular component	chylomicron; very-low-density lipoprotein particle; spherical high-density lipoprotein particle; extracellular region; early endosome; low-density lipoprotein particle; high-density lipoprotein particle; intermediate-density lipoprotein particle; extracellular space
Biological process	high-density lipoprotein particle clearance; lipid transport; positive regulation of triglyceride catabolic process; chylomicron remnant clearance; lipid metabolism; phospholipid efflux; positive regulation of lipoprotein lipase activity; positive regulation of fatty acid biosynthetic process; negative regulation of very-low-density lipoprotein particle clearance; retinoid metabolic process; negative regulation of receptor-mediated endocytosis; lipid catabolic process; positive regulation of phospholipase activity; positive regulation of phospholipid catabolic process; cholesterol efflux; very-low-density lipoprotein particle remodeling; negative regulation of cholesterol transport; cholesterol homeostasis; positive regulation of very-low-density lipoprotein particle remodeling; triglyceride-rich lipoprotein particle remodeling; triglyceride homeostasis; negative regulation of lipid metabolic process; reverse cholesterol transport; negative regulation of catalytic activity; lipoprotein transport; chylomicron remodeling; high-density lipoprotein particle remodeling; chylomicron assembly; positive regulation of catalytic activity
Sources:Amigo / QuickGO
Orthologs
Databases	NCBI: entry; OMA: entry
Species	Human	Mouse
Entrez	344	11813
Ensembl	ENSG00000234906	ENSMUSG00000002992
UniProt	P02655	Q05020
RefSeq (mRNA)	NM_000483	NM_001277944; NM_001309795
RefSeq (protein)	NP_000474; NP_000474.2	NP_001296728; NP_001264873; NP_001296724
Location (UCSC)	Chr 19: 44.95 – 44.95 Mb	Chr 7: 19.41 – 19.41 Mb
PubMed search
- Wikidata
View/Edit Human	View/Edit Mouse

Apo-CII
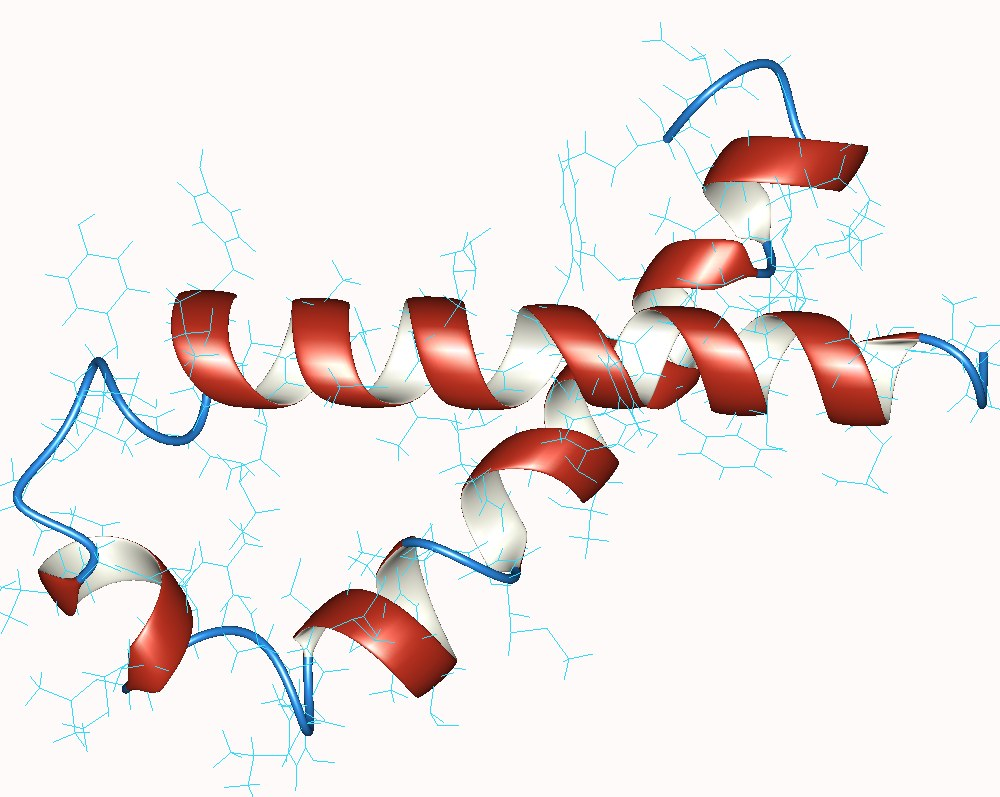
- nmr structure of human apolipoprotein c-ii in the presence of sds

Identifiers
- Symbol: Apo-CII
- Pfam: PF05355
- InterPro: IPR008019
- SCOP2: 1by6 / SCOPe / SUPFAM
Available protein structures:
- PDB: IPR008019 PF05355 (ECOD; PDBsum)
- AlphaFold: IPR008019; PF05355

Apolipoprotein C-II (Apo-CII, or Apoc-II), or apolipoprotein C2, is a protein that in humans is encoded by the APOC2 gene.

The protein encoded by this gene is secreted in plasma, where it is a component of very low density lipoproteins and chylomicrons. This protein activates the enzyme lipoprotein lipase in capillaries, which hydrolyzes triglycerides and thus provides free fatty acids and glycerols for cells. Mutations in this gene cause hyperlipoproteinemia type IB, characterized by xanthomas, pancreatitis, and hepatosplenomegaly, but no increased risk for atherosclerosis. Lab tests will show elevated blood levels of triglycerides, cholesterol, and chylomicrons

== Interactive pathway map ==
Click on genes, proteins and metabolites below to link to respective articles. (Note: The interactive pathway map can be edited at WikiPathways: "Statin_Pathway_WP430".)

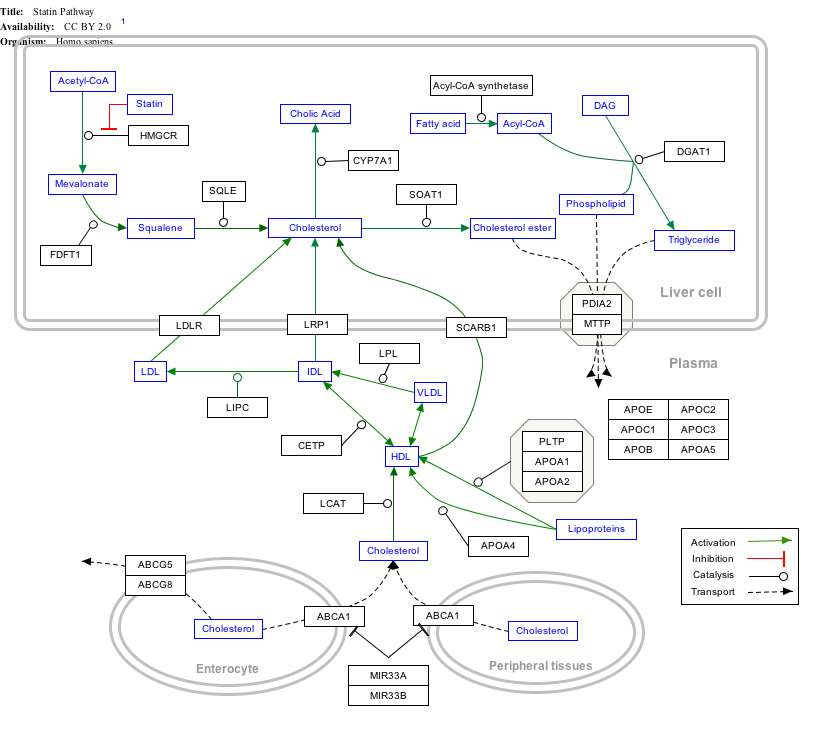

Statin pathway edit

== See also ==
- Apolipoprotein C
