= SCARB1 =

Mammalian protein

Identifiers
- Aliases: SCARB1, CD36L1, CLA-1, CLA1, HDLQTL6, SR-BI, SRB1, scavenger receptor class B member 1
- External IDs: OMIM: 601040; MGI: 893578; HomoloGene: 21132; GeneCards: SCARB1; OMA:SCARB1 - orthologs

Gene location (Human)
Chr.	Chromosome 12 (human)
Band	12q24.31	Start	124,776,856 bp
Band	12q24.31	End	124,882,668 bp

Gene location (Mouse)
Chr.	Chromosome 5 (mouse)
Band	5 64.11 cM|5 G1.1	Start	125,354,151 bp
Band	5 64.11 cM|5 G1.1	End	125,418,158 bp
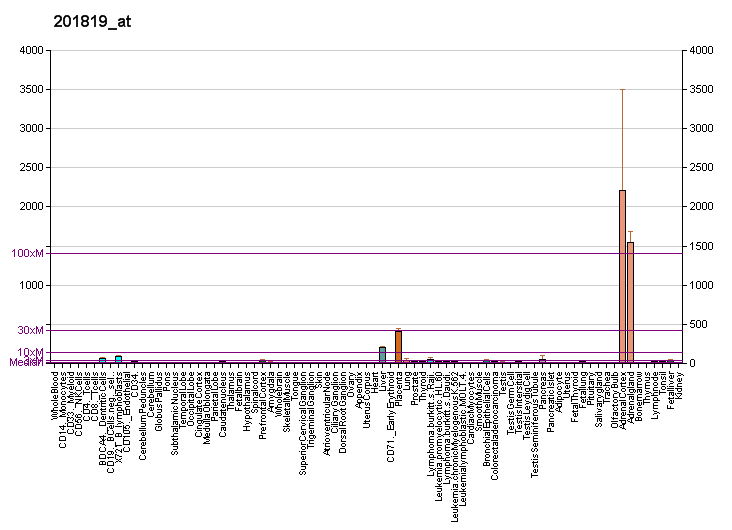

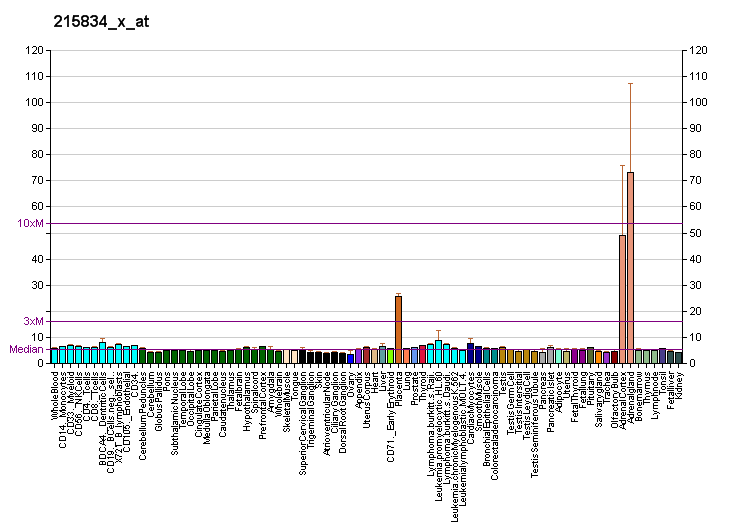
RNA expression pattern
Bgee	Human / Mouse (ortholog); Top expressed in: right adrenal cortex; left adrenal gland; left adrenal cortex; right lobe of liver; left ovary; right ovary; putamen; caudate nucleus; subcutaneous adipose tissue; placenta / Top expressed in: adrenal gland; cumulus cell; retinal pigment epithelium; Gonadal ridge; external carotid artery; internal carotid artery; neural layer of retina; lactiferous gland; yolk sac; ciliary body; More reference expression data
BioGPS	More reference expression data
Gene ontology
Molecular function	apolipoprotein binding; protein homodimerization activity; virus receptor activity; transporter activity; high-density lipoprotein particle receptor activity; phosphatidylserine binding; apolipoprotein A-I binding; lipopolysaccharide binding; low-density lipoprotein particle binding; 1-phosphatidylinositol binding; protein binding; high-density lipoprotein particle binding; lipopolysaccharide immune receptor activity; amyloid-beta binding; scavenger receptor activity
Cellular component	cytoplasm; integral component of membrane; endocytic vesicle membrane; intracellular membrane-bounded organelle; membrane; plasma membrane; integral component of plasma membrane; cell surface; lysosomal membrane; caveola; extracellular exosome; microvillus membrane
Biological process	cholesterol import; positive regulation of triglyceride biosynthetic process; regulation of phosphatidylcholine catabolic process; recognition of apoptotic cell; lipid transport; low-density lipoprotein particle clearance; blood vessel endothelial cell migration; positive regulation of cholesterol storage; phospholipid transport; cholesterol transport; wound healing; cholesterol catabolic process; receptor-mediated endocytosis; high-density lipoprotein particle remodeling; positive regulation of endothelial cell migration; androgen biosynthetic process; vitamin transmembrane transport; positive regulation of nitric-oxide synthase activity; endothelial cell proliferation; lipopolysaccharide transport; cholesterol efflux; phagocytosis, recognition; viral entry into host cell; intestinal absorption; cholesterol homeostasis; regulation of phagocytosis; adhesion of symbiont to host; viral process; detection of lipopolysaccharide; triglyceride homeostasis; reverse cholesterol transport; lipopolysaccharide-mediated signaling pathway; high-density lipoprotein particle clearance
Sources:Amigo / QuickGO
Orthologs
Species	Human	Mouse
Entrez	949	20778
Ensembl	ENSG00000073060	ENSMUSG00000037936
UniProt	Q8WTV0	Q61009
RefSeq (mRNA)	NM_005505; NM_001082959	NM_001205082; NM_001205083; NM_016741
RefSeq (protein)	NP_001076428; NP_005496; NP_001354910; NP_001354911; NP_001354912 NP_001354913; NP_001354914; NP_001354915; NP_001354916; NP_001354917; NP_001354918	NP_001192011; NP_001192012; NP_058021
Location (UCSC)	Chr 12: 124.78 – 124.88 Mb	Chr 5: 125.35 – 125.42 Mb
PubMed search
- Wikidata
View/Edit Human	View/Edit Mouse

Scavenger receptor class B type 1 (SRB1) also known as SR-BI is a protein that in humans is encoded by the SCARB1 gene. SR-BI functions as a receptor for high-density lipoprotein.

== Function ==
Scavenger receptor class B, type I (SR-BI) is an integral membrane protein found in numerous cell types/tissues, including enterocytes, the liver and adrenal gland. It is best known for its role in facilitating the uptake of cholesteryl esters from high-density lipoproteins in the liver. This process drives the movement of cholesterol from peripheral tissues towards the liver, where cholesterol can either be secreted via the bile duct or be used to synthesise steroid hormones. This movement of cholesterol is known as reverse cholesterol transport and is a protective mechanism against the development of atherosclerosis, which is the principal cause of heart disease and stroke.

SR-BI is crucial in carotenoid and vitamin E uptake in the small intestine. SR-B1 is upregulated in times of vitamin A deficiency and downregulated if vitamin A status is in the normal range.

In melanocytic cells SCARB1 gene expression may be regulated by the MITF.

== Species distribution ==
SR-BI has also been identified in the livers of non-mammalian species (turtle, goldfish, shark, chicken, frog, and skate), suggesting it emerged early in vertebrate evolutionary history. The turtle also seems to upregulate SR-BI during egg development, indicating that cholesterol efflux may be at peak levels during developmental stages.

== Clinical significance ==
SCARB1 along with CD81 is the receptor for the entry of the Hepatitis C virus into liver cells.

== Preclinical research ==
Although malignant tumors are known to display extreme heterogeneity, overexpression of SR-B1 is a relatively consistent marker in cancerous tissues. While SR-B1 normally mediates the transfer of cholesterol between high-density lipoproteins (HDL) and healthy cells, it also facilitates the selective uptake of cholesterol by malignant cells. In this way, upregulation of the SR-B1 receptor becomes an enabling factor for self-sufficient proliferation in cancerous tissue.

SR-B1 mediated delivery has also been used in the transfection of cancer cells with siRNA, or small interfering RNAs. This therapy causes RNA interference, in which short segments of double stranded RNA acts to silence targeted oncogenes post-transcription. SR-B1 mediation reduces siRNA degradation and off-target accumulation while enhancing delivery to targeted tissues. In "metastatic and taxane-resistant models of ovarian cancer, rHDL-mediated siren delivery improved responses.

== Interactive pathway map ==
Click on genes, proteins and metabolites below to link to respective articles. (Note: The interactive pathway map can be edited at WikiPathways: "Statin_Pathway_WP430".)

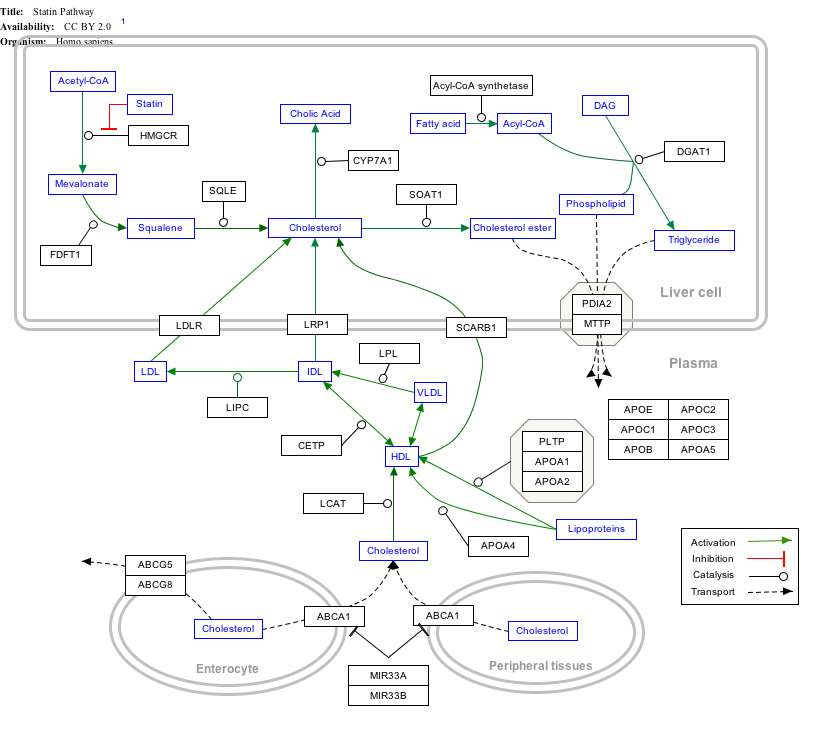

Statin pathway edit
