= Intermediate-density lipoprotein =

One of the five major groups of lipoprotein

Intermediate-density lipoproteins (IDLs) belong to the lipoprotein particle family and are formed from the degradation of very low-density lipoproteins as well as high-density lipoproteins. IDL is one of the five major groups of lipoproteins (chylomicrons, VLDL, IDL, LDL, HDL) that enable fats and cholesterol to move within the water-based solution of the bloodstream. Each native IDL particle consists of protein that encircles various lipids, enabling, as a water-soluble particle, these lipids to travel in the aqueous blood environment as part of the fat transport system within the body. Their size is, in general, 25 to 35 nm in diameter, and they contain primarily a range of triglycerides and cholesterol esters. They are cleared from the plasma into the liver by receptor-mediated endocytosis, or further degraded by hepatic lipase to form LDL particles.

Although one might intuitively assume that "intermediate-density" refers to a density between that of high-density and low-density lipoproteins, it in fact refers to a density between that of low-density and very-low-density lipoproteins. In general, IDL, somewhat similar to low-density lipoprotein (LDL), transports a variety of triglyceride fats and cholesterol and, like LDL, can also promote the growth of atheroma.

VLDL is a large, triglyceride-rich lipoprotein secreted by the liver that transports triglyceride to adipose tissue and muscle. The triglycerides in VLDL are removed in capillaries by the enzyme lipoprotein lipase, and the VLDL returns to the circulation as a smaller particle with a new name, intermediate-density lipoprotein (IDL). The IDL particles have lost most of their triglyceride, but they retain cholesteryl esters. Some of the IDL particles are rapidly taken up by the liver; others remain in circulation, where they undergo further triglyceride hydrolysis by hepatic lipase and are converted to LDL. A distinguishing feature of the IDL particle is their content of multiple copies of the receptor ligand ApoE in addition to a single copy of ApoB-100. The multiple copies of ApoE allow IDL to bind to the LDL receptor with a very high affinity. When IDL is converted to LDL, the ApoE leaves the particle and only the ApoB-100 remains. Thereafter, the affinity for the LDL receptor is much reduced.
