= High-density lipoprotein =

One of the five major groups of lipoprotein

Good cholesterol levels age standardized

High-density lipoprotein (HDL) is one of the five major groups of lipoproteins. Lipoproteins are complex particles composed of multiple proteins which transport all fat molecules (lipids) around the body within the water outside cells. They are typically composed of 80–100 proteins per particle (organized by one, two or three ApoA). HDL particles enlarge while circulating in the blood, aggregating more fat molecules and transporting up to hundreds of fat molecules per particle.

HDL particles are commonly referred to as "good cholesterol", because they transport fat molecules out of artery walls, reduce macrophage accumulation, and thus help prevent or even regress atherosclerosis.

Lipoproteins are divided into five subgroups, by density/size (an inverse relationship), which also correlates with function and incidence of cardiovascular events. Unlike the larger lipoprotein particles, which deliver fat molecules to cells, HDL particles remove fat molecules from cells. The lipids carried include cholesterol, phospholipids, and triglycerides, amounts of each are variable.

HDL particles remove fats and cholesterol from cells, including within artery wall atheroma, and transport it back to the liver for excretion or re-use. Increasing concentrations of HDL particles in the blood are associated with decreasing accumulation of atherosclerosis within the walls of arteries, reducing the risk of sudden plaque ruptures, cardiovascular disease, stroke and other vascular diseases. People with higher levels of HDL-C tend to have fewer problems with cardiovascular diseases, while those with low HDL-C levels (especially less than 40 mg/dL or about 1 mmol/L) have increased rates for heart disease. Higher native HDL levels are correlated with lowered risk of cardiovascular disease in healthy people.

However, a higher blood level of HDL is not necessarily protective against cardiovascular disease and may even be harmful in extremely high quantities, with an increased cardiovascular risk, especially in hypertensive patients.

== Testing ==
Because of the high cost of directly measuring HDL particles, blood tests commonly measure a surrogate value, HDL-cholesterol (HDL-C), i.e. the cholesterol associated with HDL particles. HDL-C is often contrasted with the amount of cholesterol estimated to be carried within low-density lipoprotein particles, known as LDL-C, with HDL-C being nicknamed "good cholesterol" and LDL-C "bad cholesterol".

In healthy individuals, about 30% of blood cholesterol, along with other fats, is carried by HDL. This is often contrasted with the amount of cholesterol estimated to be carried within low-density lipoprotein particles, LDL, and called LDL-C. HDL particles remove fats and cholesterol from cells, including within artery wall atheroma, and transport it back to the liver for excretion or re-utilization; thus the cholesterol carried within HDL particles (HDL-C) is sometimes called "good cholesterol". Those with higher levels of HDL-C tend to have fewer problems with cardiovascular diseases, while those with low HDL-C cholesterol levels (especially less than 40 mg/dL or about 1 mmol/L) have increased rates for heart disease. Higher native HDL levels are correlated with lowered risk of cardiovascular disease in healthy people.

The remainder of the serum cholesterol after subtracting the HDL is the non-HDL cholesterol. The concentration of these other components, which may cause atheroma, is known as the non-HDL-C. This is now preferred to LDL-C as a secondary marker as it has been shown to be a better predictor and it is more easily calculated.

== Structure and function ==
With a size ranging from 5 to 17 nm, HDL is the smallest of the lipoprotein particles. It is the densest because it contains the highest proportion of protein to lipids. Its most abundant apolipoproteins are apo A-I and apo A-II. A rare genetic variant, ApoA-1 Milano, has been documented to be far more effective in both protecting against and regressing arterial disease, atherosclerosis.

The liver synthesizes these lipoproteins as complexes of apolipoproteins and phospholipid, which resemble cholesterol-free flattened spherical lipoprotein particles, whose NMR structure was published; the complexes are capable of picking up cholesterol, carried internally, from cells by interaction with the ATP-binding cassette transporter A1 (ABCA1). HDL is also produced in the intestine. A plasma enzyme called lecithin-cholesterol acyltransferase (LCAT) converts the free cholesterol into cholesteryl ester (a more hydrophobic form of cholesterol), which is then sequestered into the core of the lipoprotein particle, eventually causing the newly synthesized HDL to assume a spherical shape. HDL particles increase in size as they circulate through the blood and incorporate more cholesterol and phospholipid molecules from cells and other lipoproteins, such as by interaction with the ABCG1 transporter and the phospholipid transport protein (PLTP).

HDL transports cholesterol mostly to the liver or steroidogenic organs such as adrenals, ovary, and testes by both direct and indirect pathways. HDL is removed by HDL receptors such as scavenger receptor BI (SR-BI), which mediate the selective uptake of cholesterol from HDL. In humans, probably the most relevant pathway is the indirect one, which is mediated by cholesteryl ester transfer protein (CETP). This protein exchanges triglycerides of VLDL against cholesteryl esters of HDL. As the result, VLDLs are processed to LDL, which are removed from the circulation by the LDL receptor pathway. The triglycerides are not stable in HDL, but are degraded by hepatic lipase so that, finally, small HDL particles are left, which restart the uptake of cholesterol from cells.

The cholesterol delivered to the liver is excreted into the bile and, hence, intestine either directly or indirectly after conversion into bile acids. Delivery of HDL cholesterol to adrenals, ovaries, and testes is important for the synthesis of steroid hormones.

Several steps in the metabolism of HDL can participate in the transport of cholesterol from lipid-laden macrophages of atherosclerotic arteries, termed foam cells, to the liver for secretion into the bile. This pathway has been termed reverse cholesterol transport and is considered as the classical protective function of HDL toward atherosclerosis.

HDL carries many lipid and protein species, several of which have very low concentrations but are biologically very active. For example, HDL and its protein and lipid constituents help to inhibit oxidation, inflammation, activation of the endothelium, coagulation, and platelet aggregation. All these properties may contribute to the ability of HDL to protect from atherosclerosis, and it is not yet known which are the most important. In addition, a small subfraction of HDL lends protection against the protozoan parasite Trypanosoma brucei brucei. This HDL subfraction, termed trypanosome lytic factor (TLF), contains specialized proteins that, while very active, are unique to the TLF molecule.

In the stress response, serum amyloid A, which is one of the acute-phase proteins and an apolipoprotein, is under the stimulation of cytokines (interleukin 1, interleukin 6), and cortisol produced in the adrenal cortex and carried to the damaged tissue incorporated into HDL particles. At the inflammation site, it attracts and activates leukocytes. In chronic inflammations, its deposition in the tissues manifests itself as amyloidosis.

It has been postulated that the concentration of large HDL particles more accurately reflects protective action, as opposed to the concentration of total HDL particles. This ratio of large HDL to total HDL particles varies widely and is measured only by more sophisticated lipoprotein assays using either electrophoresis (the original method developed in the 1970s) or newer NMR spectroscopy methods (See also nuclear magnetic resonance and spectroscopy), developed in the 1990s.

=== Subfractions ===
Five subfractions of HDL have been identified. From largest (and most effective in cholesterol removal) to smallest (and least effective), the types are 2a, 2b, 3a, 3b, and 3c.

== Epidemiology ==
Men tend to have noticeably lower HDL concentrations, with smaller size and lower cholesterol content, than women. Men also have a greater incidence of atherosclerotic heart disease. Studies confirm the fact that HDL has a buffering role in balancing the effects of the hypercoagulable state in type 2 diabetics and decreases the high risk of cardiovascular complications in these patients. Also, the results obtained in this study revealed that there was a significant negative correlation between HDL and activated partial thromboplastin time (APTT).

Epidemiological studies have shown that high concentrations of HDL (over 60 mg/dL) have protective value against cardiovascular diseases such as ischemic stroke and myocardial infarction. Low concentrations of HDL (below 40 mg/dL for men, below 50 mg/dL for women) increase the risk for atherosclerotic diseases.

Data from the landmark Framingham Heart Study showed that, for a given level of LDL, the risk of heart disease increases 10-fold as the HDL varies from high to low. On the converse, however, for a fixed level of HDL, the risk increases 3-fold as LDL varies from low to high.

Even people with very low LDL levels achieved by statin treatment are exposed to increased risk if their HDL levels are not high enough.

Very high HDL-C levels (≥80 mg/dL in men, ≥100 mg/dL in women) appear to be detrimental to cardiovascular outcomes. Several genetic conditions cause abnormally low or high HDL-C levels, often without the expected change in cardiovascular disease rates. In fact, when many known correlates of CVD risks are controlled for, HDL-C does not have any correlation with cardiovascular event risks. In this way, HDL-C only seems to serve as an imperfect, but easy-to-measure, proxy for a healthy lifestyle. What does correlate well with CVD risks even when these factors are controlled for is a direct measure of the capability for reverse cholesterol transport in a person's blood serum, the cholesterol efflux capacity (CEC).

== Estimating HDL via associated cholesterol ==
Clinical laboratories formerly measured HDL cholesterol by separating other lipoprotein fractions using either ultracentrifugation or chemical precipitation with divalent ions such as Mg^{2+}, then coupling the products of a cholesterol oxidase reaction to an indicator reaction. The reference method still uses a combination of these techniques. Most laboratories now use automated homogeneous analytical methods in which lipoproteins containing apo B are blocked using antibodies to apo B, then a colorimetric enzyme reaction measures cholesterol in the non-blocked HDL particles. HPLC can also be used. Subfractions (HDL-2C, HDL-3C) can be measured, but clinical significance of these subfractions has not been determined. The measurement of apo-A reactive capacity can be used to measure HDL cholesterol but is thought to be less accurate.

=== Recommended ranges ===
The American Heart Association, NIH and NCEP provide a set of guidelines for fasting HDL levels and risk for heart disease.

Level mg/dL	Level mmol/L	Interpretation
<40 (men), <50 (women)	<1.03 (men), <1.29 (women)	Low HDL cholesterol, considered correlated for heart disease (heightened risk)
40–59 (men), 50–59 (women)	1.03–1.55 (men), 1.29–1.55 (women)	Medium HDL level
>59	>1.55	High HDL level, optimal condition considered correlated against heart disease

High LDL with low HDL level is an additional risk factor for cardiovascular disease.

== Measuring HDL concentration and sizes ==
As technology has reduced costs and clinical trials have continued to demonstrate the importance of HDL, methods for directly measuring HDL concentrations and size (which indicates function) at lower costs have become more widely available and increasingly regarded as important for assessing individual risk for progressive arterial disease and treatment methods.

=== Electrophoresis measurements ===
Since the HDL particles have a net negative charge and vary by density & size, ultracentrifugation combined with electrophoresis have been utilized since before 1950 to enumerate the concentration of HDL particles and sort them by size with a specific volume of blood plasma. Larger HDL particles are carrying more cholesterol.

=== NMR measurements ===
Concentration and sizes of lipoprotein particles can be estimated using nuclear magnetic resonance fingerprinting.

==== Optimal total and large HDL concentrations ====
The HDL particle concentrations are typically categorized by event rate percentiles based on the people participating and being tracked in the MESA trial, a medical research study sponsored by the United States National Heart, Lung, and Blood Institute.

Total HDL particle Table
MESA Percentile	Total HDL particles μmol/L	Interpretation
>75%	>34.9	Those with highest (Optimal) total HDL particle concentrations & lowest rates of cardiovascular disease events
50–75%	30.5–34.5	Those with moderately high total HDL particle concentrations & moderate rates of cardiovascular disease events
25–50%	26.7–30.5	Those with lower total HDL particle concentrations & Borderline-High rates of cardiovascular disease
0–25%	<26.7	Those with lowest total HDL particle concentrations & Highest rates of cardiovascular disease events

Large (protective) HDL particle Table
MESA Percentile	Large HDL particles μmol/L	Interpretation
>75%	>7.3	Those with highest (Optimal) Large HDL particle concentrations & lowest rates of cardiovascular disease events
50–75%	4.8–7.3	Those with moderately high Large HDL particle concentrations & moderate rates of cardiovascular disease events
25–50%	3.1–4.8	Those with lower Large HDL particle concentrations & Borderline-High rates of cardiovascular disease
0–25%	<3.1	Those with lowest Large HDL particle concentrations & Highest rates of cardiovascular disease events

The lowest incidence of atherosclerotic events over time occurs within those with both the highest concentrations of total HDL particles (the top quarter, >75%) and the highest concentrations of large HDL particles. Multiple additional measures, including LDL particle concentrations, small LDL particle concentrations, VLDL concentrations, estimations of insulin resistance and standard cholesterol lipid measurements (for comparison of the plasma data with the estimation methods discussed above) are routinely provided in clinical testing.

== Increasing HDL levels ==
While higher HDL levels are correlated with lower risk of cardiovascular diseases, no medication used to increase HDL has been proven to improve health. As of 2017, numerous lifestyle changes and drugs to increase HDL levels were under study.

HDL lipoprotein particles that bear apolipoprotein C3 are associated with increased, rather than decreased, risk for coronary heart disease.

=== Diet and exercise ===
Certain changes in diet and exercise may have a positive impact on raising HDL levels:

- Decreased intake of simple carbohydrates.
- Aerobic exercise
- Weight loss
- Avocado consumption
- Magnesium supplements raise HDL-C.
- Addition of soluble fiber to diet
- Consumption of omega-3 fatty acids such as fish oil or flax oil
- Increased intake of unsaturated fats
- Removal of trans fatty acids from the diet

Most saturated fats increase HDL cholesterol to varying degrees but also raise total and LDL cholesterol.

=== Recreational drugs ===
HDL levels can be increased by smoking cessation, or mild to moderate alcohol intake.

Cannabis in unadjusted analyses, past and current cannabis use was not associated with higher HDL-C levels. A study performed in 4635 patients demonstrated no effect on the HDL-C levels (P=0.78) [the mean (standard error) HDL-C values in control subjects (never used), past users and current users were 53.4 (0.4), 53.9 (0.6) and 53.9 (0.7) mg/dL, respectively].

Exogenous anabolic androgenic steroids, particularly 17α-alkylated anabolic steroids and others administered orally, can reduce HDL-C by 50 percent or more. Other androgen receptor agonists such as selective androgen receptor modulators can also lower HDL. As there is some evidence that the HDL reduction is caused by increased reverse cholesterol transport, it is unknown if AR agonists' HDL-lowering effect is pro- or anti-atherogenic.

=== Pharmaceutical drugs and niacin ===
Pharmacological therapy to increase the level of HDL cholesterol includes use of fibrates and niacin. Fibrates have not been proven to have an effect on overall deaths from all causes, despite their effects on lipids.

Niacin (nicotinic acid, a form of vitamin B3) increases HDL by selectively inhibiting hepatic diacylglycerol acyltransferase 2, reducing triglyceride synthesis and VLDL secretion through a receptor HM74 otherwise known as niacin receptor 2 and HM74A / GPR109A, niacin receptor 1.

Pharmacologic (1- to 3-gram/day) niacin doses increase HDL levels by 10–30%, making it the most powerful agent to increase HDL-cholesterol. A randomized clinical trial demonstrated that treatment with niacin can significantly reduce atherosclerosis progression and cardiovascular events. Niacin products sold as "no-flush", i.e. not having side-effects such as "niacin flush", do not, however, contain free nicotinic acid and are therefore ineffective at raising HDL, while products sold as "sustained-release" may contain free nicotinic acid, but "some brands are hepatotoxic"; therefore the recommended form of niacin for raising HDL is the cheapest, immediate-release preparation. Both fibrates and niacin increase artery toxic homocysteine, an effect that can be counteracted by also consuming a multivitamin with relatively high amounts of the B-vitamins, but multiple European trials of the most popular B-vitamin cocktails, trial showing 30% average reduction in homocysteine, while not showing problems have also not shown any benefit in reducing cardiovascular event rates. A 2011 extended-release niacin (Niaspan) study was halted early because patients adding niacin to their statin treatment showed no increase in heart health, but did experience an increase in the risk of stroke.

In contrast, while the use of statins is effective against high levels of LDL cholesterol, most have little or no effect in raising HDL cholesterol. Rosuvastatin and pitavastatin, however, have been demonstrated to significantly raise HDL levels.

Lovaza has been shown to increase HDL-C. However, the best evidence to date suggests it has no benefit for primary or secondary prevention of cardiovascular disease.

The PPAR modulator GW501516 has shown a positive effect on HDL-C and an antiatherogenic where LDL is an issue. However, research on the drug has been discontinued after it was discovered to cause rapid cancer development in several organs in rats.

== See also ==
- Asymmetric dimethylarginine
- Cardiovascular disease
- Cholesteryl ester storage disease
- Endothelium
- Lipid profile
- Lysosomal acid lipase deficiency
