= ABCG1 =

Mammalian protein found in Homo sapiens

Identifiers
- Aliases: ABCG1, ABC8, WHITE1, ATP binding cassette subfamily G member 1
- External IDs: OMIM: 603076; MGI: 107704; GeneCards: ABCG1

Gene location (Human)
| Chr. | Chromosome 21 (human) |
| Band | 21q22.3 | Start | 42,199,689 bp |
| Band | 21q22.3 | End | 42,297,244 bp |

Gene location (Mouse)
| Chr. | Chromosome 17 (mouse) |
| Band | 17|17 A3.3 | Start | 31,276,649 bp |
| Band | 17|17 A3.3 | End | 31,336,962 bp |
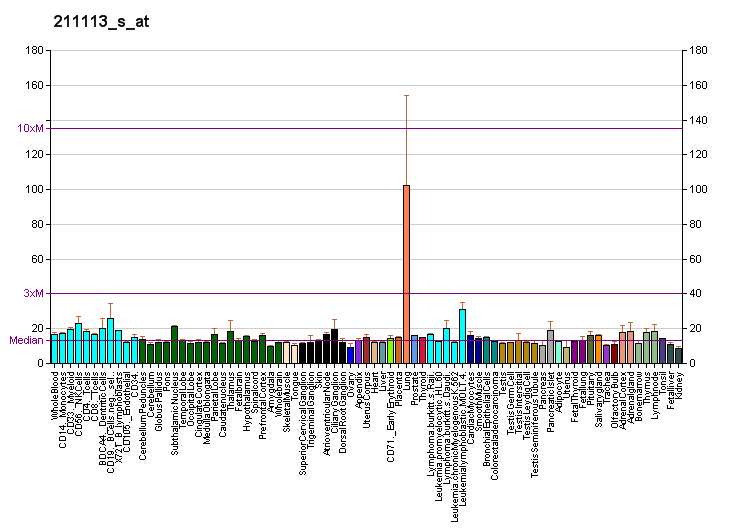

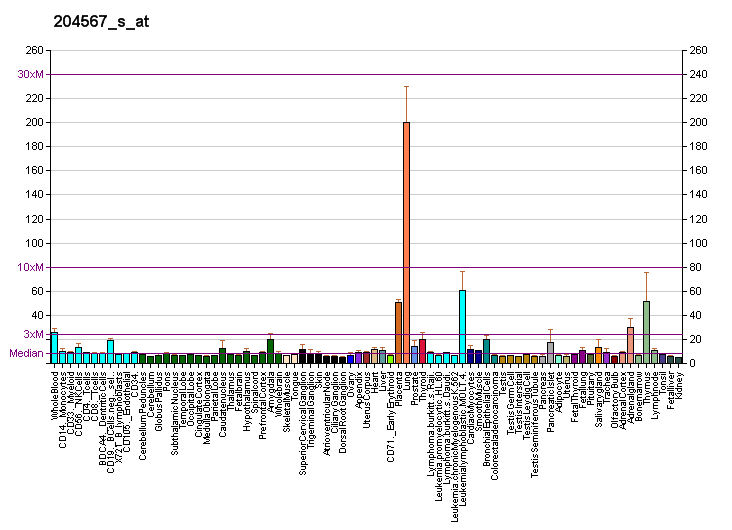
RNA expression pattern
| Bgee | Human / Mouse (ortholog); Top expressed in: right adrenal gland; left adrenal gland; right adrenal cortex; jejunal mucosa; left adrenal cortex; spleen; Skeletal muscle tissue of rectus abdominis; lower lobe of lung; amniotic fluid; internal globus pallidus / Top expressed in: globus pallidus; right lung lobe; olfactory tubercle; stria vascularis; dorsal striatum; medial dorsal nucleus; median eminence; arcuate nucleus; olfactory epithelium; lateral geniculate nucleus; More reference expression data |
| BioGPS | More reference expression data |
Gene ontology
| Molecular function | nucleotide binding; protein dimerization activity; protein homodimerization activity; ADP binding; phospholipid transporter activity; ABC-type sterol transporter activity; cholesterol binding; ATPase activity; toxin transmembrane transporter activity; protein binding; protein heterodimerization activity; phospholipid binding; ATP binding; cholesterol transfer activity; ATPase-coupled transmembrane transporter activity |
| Cellular component | integral component of membrane; recycling endosome; endosome; Golgi apparatus; endoplasmic reticulum membrane; membrane; Golgi membrane; plasma membrane; integral component of plasma membrane; endoplasmic reticulum; mitochondrion; external side of plasma membrane |
| Biological process | phospholipid homeostasis; lipid transport; regulation of transcription, DNA-templated; detection of hormone stimulus; phospholipid efflux; glycoprotein transport; cholesterol transport; cholesterol metabolic process; response to organic substance; negative regulation of cholesterol storage; response to lipid; intracellular cholesterol transport; low-density lipoprotein particle remodeling; positive regulation of cholesterol efflux; transmembrane transport; cholesterol efflux; positive regulation of cholesterol biosynthetic process; negative regulation of lipid storage; cholesterol homeostasis; regulation of cholesterol esterification; negative regulation of macrophage derived foam cell differentiation; amyloid precursor protein catabolic process; reverse cholesterol transport; toxin transport; high-density lipoprotein particle remodeling; transport; cellular response to high density lipoprotein particle stimulus; positive regulation of protein secretion; positive regulation of amyloid-beta formation |
Sources:Amigo / QuickGO
Orthologs
| Databases | NCBI: entry; OMA: entry |
| Species | Human | Mouse |
| Entrez | 9619 | 11307 |
| Ensembl | ENSG00000160179 | ENSMUSG00000024030 |
| UniProt | P45844 | Q64343 |
| RefSeq (mRNA) | NM_004915; NM_016818; NM_207174; NM_207627; NM_207628 NM_207629; NM_207630 | NM_009593 |
| RefSeq (protein) | NP_004906; NP_058198; NP_997057; NP_997510; NP_997511 NP_997512 | NP_033723 |
| Location (UCSC) | Chr 21: 42.2 – 42.3 Mb | Chr 17: 31.28 – 31.34 Mb |
| PubMed search |
- Wikidata
| View/Edit Human | View/Edit Mouse |

ATP-binding cassette sub-family G member 1 is a protein that in humans is encoded by the ABCG1 gene. It is a homolog of the well-known Drosophila gene white.

== Function ==
The protein encoded by this gene is a member of the superfamily of ATP-binding cassette (ABC) transporters. ABC proteins transport various molecules across extra- and intra-cellular membranes. ABC genes are divided into seven distinct subfamilies (ABC1, MDR/TAP, MRP, ALD, OABP, GCN20, White). This protein is a member of the White subfamily (subfamily G). It is involved in macrophage cholesterol and phospholipids transport, and may regulate cellular lipid homeostasis in other cell types. Several alternative splice variants have been identified.

== See also ==
- ATP-binding cassette transporter
