= Cholesteryl ester =

Dietary lipid

Cholesteryl oleate, a member of the cholesteryl ester family

Cholesteryl esters are a type of dietary lipid and are ester derivatives of cholesterol. The ester bond is formed between the carboxylate group of a fatty acid and the hydroxyl group of cholesterol. Cholesteryl esters have a lower solubility in water due to their increased hydrophobicity. Esters are formed by replacing at least one –OH (hydroxyl) group with an –O–alkyl (alkoxy) group. They can be hydrolyzed by certain enzymes, such as the pancreatic enzyme carboxyl ester lipase, to produce cholesterol and free fatty acids. They are associated with atherosclerosis.

Cholesteryl esters are found in human brains as lipid droplets which store and transport cholesterol. Increased levels of cholesteryl esters have been found in certain parts of the brain of people with Huntington's disease. Higher concentrations of cholesteryl esters have been found in the caudate and putamen, but not the cerebellum, of people with Huntington disease compared with levels in controls. Increase in cholesteryl esters has also been found in other neurological disorders like multiple sclerosis and Alzheimer's disease.

== Transfer of cholesteryl ester ==
Cholesteryl esters are transported from high-density lipoproteins (HDLs) to low-density lipoproteins (LDLs) and very low-density lipoproteins (VLDLs) with cholesteryl ester transfer protein (CETP). The decrease in cholesteryl esters can lower HDL and increase LDL, which may be an indicator of cardiovascular problems, as indicated by intervention studies. Increasing HDL values has the potential to prevent mortality associated with cardiovascular risks such as atherosclerosis.

== See also ==
- Cholesteryl ester transfer protein
- Cholesteryl ester storage disease
- Cholesterol esterification disorder
- Acyl CoA cholesteryl acyltransferase (ACAT)
- Lecithin–cholesterol acyltransferase (LCAT)
