= Very low-density lipoprotein =

One of the five major groups of lipoprotein

Very-low-density lipoprotein (VLDL), density relative to extracellular water, is a type of lipoprotein made by the liver. VLDL is one of the five major groups of lipoproteins (chylomicrons, VLDL, intermediate-density lipoprotein, low-density lipoprotein, high-density lipoprotein) that enable fats and cholesterol to move within the water-based solution of the bloodstream. VLDL is assembled in the liver from triglycerides, cholesterol, and apolipoproteins. VLDL is converted in the bloodstream to low-density lipoprotein (LDL) and intermediate-density lipoprotein (IDL). VLDL particles have a diameter of 30–80 nanometers (nm). VLDL transports endogenous products, whereas chylomicrons transport exogenous (dietary) products. In the early 2010s both the lipid composition and protein composition of this lipoprotein were characterised in great detail.

== Physical properties ==
Very-low-density lipoprotein size is variable, with diameters ranging from approximately 35 to 70 nm. Some researchers further classify VLDL particles into VLDL1 and VLDL2 based on size (as measured by Svedberg flotation units), where VLDL1 particles are larger and contain more triglycerides, while other researchers create a tripartite system by subdividing VLDL1 into larger VLDL1 and smaller VLDL2 and relabeling VLDL2 as VLDL3.

== Function ==
Very-low-density lipoproteins transport endogenous triglycerides, phospholipids, cholesterol, and cholesteryl esters. They function as the body's internal transport mechanism for lipids. In addition they can assist in long-range transport of hydrophobic intercellular messengers, like the morphogen Indian hedgehog (protein).

== Changes during circulation ==
Nascent VLDL released from the liver contains apolipoprotein B100, apolipoprotein C1 (apoC1), apolipoprotein E (apoE), cholesterol, cholesteryl esters, and triglycerides. As it circulates in blood, it picks up apolipoprotein C-II (apoC-II) and additional apoE donated from high-density lipoprotein (HDL). At this point, nascent VLDL becomes a mature VLDL. Once in circulation, VLDL will come in contact with lipoprotein lipase (LPL) in the capillary beds in the body (adipose, cardiac, and skeletal muscle). LPL will remove triglycerides from VLDL for storage or energy production. VLDL now meets back up with HDL where apoC-II is transferred back to HDL (but keeps apoE). HDL also transfers cholesteryl esters to the VLDL in exchange for phospholipids and triglycerides via cholesterylester transfer protein (CETP). As more and more triglycerides are removed from the VLDL because of the action of LPL and CETP enzymes, the composition of the molecule changes, and it becomes intermediate-density lipoprotein (IDL).

Fifty percent of IDLs are recognized by receptors in the liver cells because of the apolipoprotein B-100 (apoB-100) and apoE they contain and are endocytosed. The other 50% of IDL lose apoE; when their cholesterol content becomes greater than the content of triglyceride, they become LDL, with apoB-100 as the primary apolipoprotein. The LDL is taken into a cell via the LDL receptor via endocytosis, where the contents are either stored, used for cell membrane structure, or converted into other products such as steroid hormones or bile acids.

== See also ==
- Combined hyperlipidemia
- Lipid profile
