= Hypoalphalipoproteinemia =

- Hypoalphalipoproteinemia has an autosomal dominant pattern of inheritance.
- Specialty: Endocrinology

Hypoalphalipoproteinemia (HA) is a high-density lipoprotein deficiency, inherited in an autosomal dominant manner. It can be associated with LDL receptor.

== Complications ==
Higher prevalence of heart disease and stroke have been found among patients diagnosed with HA.

== Diagnosis and Treatment ==
HDL levels below 40mg/dL define HA. Niacin is sometimes prescribed to raise HDL levels. Statin medications can also be used to increase HDL levels.

== Genetics ==
Name	OMIM	Locus	Candidates
HDLCQ1	606613	9p	ABCA1 (Tangier disease)
HDLCQ2	607053	8q23	
HDLCQ3	607687	16q24.1	Lecithin cholesterol acyltransferase deficiency (LCAT)
HDLCQ4	610239	4q32	
HDLD3	605201	11q23.3	APOA1

== See also ==
- CER-001
