= Apolipoprotein A-IV =

Protein-coding gene in humans

An Error has occurred retrieving Wikidata item for infobox Apolipoprotein A-IV (also known as apoA-IV, apoAIV, or apoA4) is plasma protein that is the product of the human gene APOA4.

== Gene ==
APOA4 resides on chromosome 11 in close linkage to APOA1 and APOC3. APOA4 contains 3 exons separated by two introns, and is polymorphic, although most of the reported sequence polymorphisms occur in exon 3. The best validated and studied non-synonymous SNPs are a glutamine → histidine substitution at codon 360 and a threonine → serine substitution at codon 347; a sequence polymorphism has also been identified in the 3'UTR of the third exon. Intra-species comparative gene sequence analysis suggests that the APOA4 gene arose from APOA1 by gene duplication approximately 270 MYA.

== Function ==
The primary translation product of the APOA4 gene is a 396-residue preprotein, which undergoes proteolytic processing to yield apo A-IV, a 376-residue mature O-linked glycoprotein. In most mammals, including humans, apo A-IV synthesis is confined to the intestine; however in mice and rats hepatic synthesis also occurs. Apo A-IV is secreted into circulation on the surface of newly synthesized chylomicron particles. Intestinal fat absorption dramatically increases the synthesis and secretion of apo A-IV. Although its primary function in human lipid metabolism has not been established, apo A-IV has been found to:

- activate lecithin-cholesterol acyltransferase and cholesterylester transfer protein in vitro;
- play a role in the regulation of appetite and satiety in rodent models;
- display anti-oxidant and anti-atherogenic properties in vitro and in rodent models;
- modulate the efficiency of enterocyte and hepatic transcellular lipid transport in vitro.

Human apo A-IV deficiency has not been reported.

== Interactions ==
APOA4 has been shown to interact with GPLD1.

== Interactive pathway map ==
Click on genes, proteins and metabolites below to link to respective articles. (Note: The interactive pathway map can be edited at WikiPathways: "Statin_Pathway_WP430".)

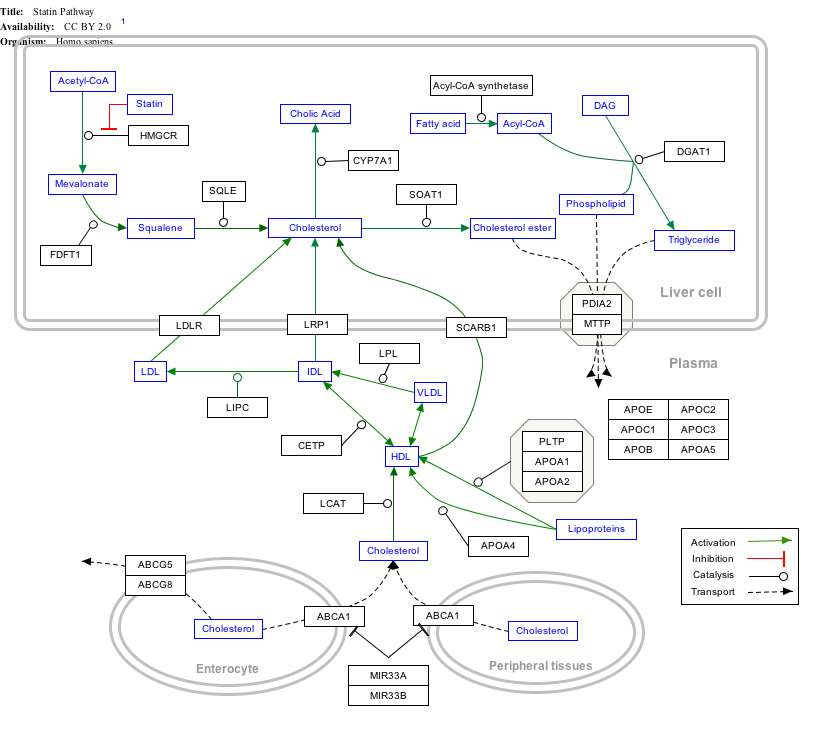

Statin pathway edit
