= CER-001 =

High-density lipoprotein mimetic

Clinical data
- Other names: CER-001, CER 001
- Routes of administration: Infusion

Identifiers
- CAS Number: 1383435-67-3
- DrugBank: DB18538

CER-001 is a recombinant high-density lipoprotein (HDL) mimetic that has orphan drug status. It is in early-stage clinical trials for the potential treatment of hypoalphalipoproteinaemia, acute coronary syndrome (ACS), acute kidney injury (AKI), atherosclerosis and lecithin cholesterol acyltransferase (LCAT) deficiency. CER-001 is also under investigation as possible agent for treating hyperinflammatory states based on lipid profile alterations due to COVID-19.

== Chemistry ==
CER-001 is an artificially synthesized mimetic of recombinant human apolipoprotein AI (ApoA1), the main structural protein of natural HDL, together with two phospholipids, which are: sphingomyelin and dipalmitoyl-phosphatidylglycerol.

== Mechanism of action ==
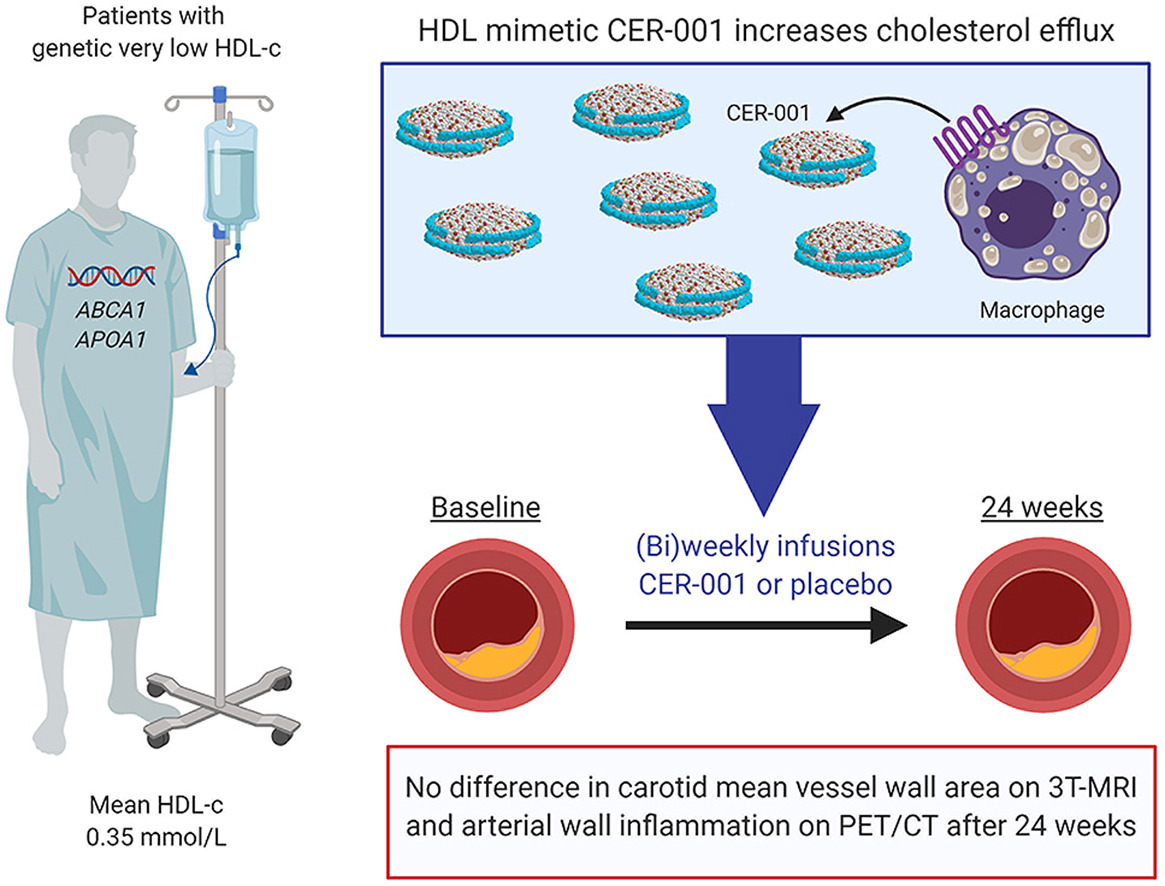
Mechanism of action of CER-001

CER-001 is designed to mimic the natural structure and function of nascent HDL, also known as pre-beta HDL. This mimicry stimulates cholesterol efflux from macrophages, captures cholesterol and eliminates it via reverse lipid transport (RLT) pathway, also known as reverse cholesterol transport (RCT) pathway.

== Pre-clinical studies ==
A pre-clinical study in mice investigated whether LCAT deficiency affects the catabolic behavior of CER-001 and evaluated the effects of the substance on kidney diseases associated with LCAT deficiency. In the mouse model, it appeared to improve the dyslipidemia typically associated with LCAT deficiency and mitigate renal damages in LCAT deficiency.

== Clinical trials ==
CER-001 was given in clinical human studies by intravenous infusion. It did not appear to affect clinical chemistry, hematology or coagulation parameters and is considered safe.
