= SemBioSys Genetics =

Definct biotechnology company

SemBioSys Genetics Inc.
- Type: Public
- Industry: Biotechnology
- Headquarters: Calgary, Alberta, Canada
- Key people: James Szarko, President and CEO
- Number of employees: Approximately 20
- Website: www.sembiosys.com

SemBioSys Genetics Inc. was a development stage agricultural biotechnology company. It utilized its patented safflower pharming platform to develop and make proteins and oils for the nutraceutical, functional food and beverage, and pharmaceutical industries. A University of Calgary spin-off (1994), SemBioSys became a publicly traded firm. Investors had included Bay City Capital, the Business Development Bank of Canada, Dow AgroSciences (a Canadian subsidiary of The Dow Chemical Company), Royal Bank Ventures Inc. (now RBC Capital Partners), the University of Calgary, Ventures West Capital Ltd., and Dr. Maurice Moloney. In May 2012, SemBioSys terminated its operations.

The company's strategy was to partner with other companies to enable the commercialization of products. Its lead pharmaceutical products under development were biosimilar insulin and Apo AI(Milano). In a phase I/II clinical trial, SemBioSys demonstrated that its safflower produced insulin (SBS-1000) is bioequivalent to humulin, a commercially available insulin.

In 2007, SemBioSys formed a subsidiary, Botaneco Specialty Ingredients Inc., dedicated to the commercialization of SemBioSys’ products for cosmetic, personal care and prescription topical dermatology products. Botaneco produced, marketed, and sold its products under the brand name Hydresia. In October 2009, Botaneco merged with Quebec City-based Advitech, a health sciences and technology company.

In October 2011, SemBioSys signed a collaboration agreement with Tasly Pharmaceuticals of Tianjin (China) and its wholly owned subsidiary Tasly U.S. Tasly is of China's top five largest producers of traditional Chinese medicines (TCMs). Upon government approval, a new company called Tasly-SemBioSys Bio-Pharmaceuticals Co., Ltd. was incorporated in Tianjin, China. The new company was structured as a Sino-Foreign Equity Joint Venture and seeks to develop and commercialize a variety of products including pharmaceutical, functional foods, and nutraceuticals for China and the world. However SemBioSys did not transfer any intellectual property to the joint venture and Tasly terminated the agreement.

== See also ==
- Plant-made pharmaceuticals
