= Limone =

Limone may refer to:

- Limone (Wedding Peach), fictional character
- Limone, Italy or Limone sul Garda, town and comune in Italy
- Limone Piemonte, town and comune in Italy
