= ApoA-I Milano =

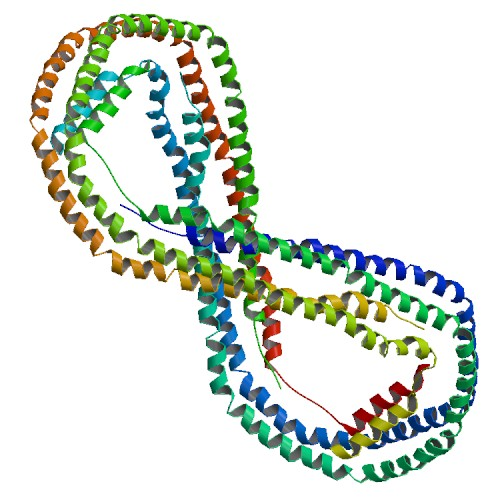

Apolipoprotein A-I Milano (also ETC-216, now MDCO-216) is a naturally occurring mutated variant of the apolipoprotein A1 protein found in human HDL, the lipoprotein particle that carries cholesterol from tissues to the liver and is associated with protection against cardiovascular disease. ApoA-I Milano was first identified by Dr. Cesare Sirtori in Milan, who also demonstrated that its presence significantly reduced cardiovascular disease, even though it caused a reduction in HDL levels and an increase in triglyceride levels.

== Discovery ==
The ApoA-I Milano mutation was found by University of Milan researchers after their 1974 investigation of a low HDL / high triglyceride phenotype exhibited by Valerio Dagnoli of Limone sul Garda, a small village in northern Italy. Limone had only 1,000 inhabitants at the time and when blood tests were run on the entire population of the village, the mutation was found to be present in about 3.5% of the local population. The mutation was traced to one man, Giovanni Pomarelli, who was born in the village in 1780 and passed it on to his offspring. It is characterised by the replacement of arginine by cysteine at position 173 (197 for UniProt). The mutation is known in single nucleotide polymorphism (SNP) nomenclature as rs28931573.

In the 1990s, researchers at the Cedars-Sinai Medical Center showed that injection of a synthetic version of the mutant ApoA-I into rabbits and mice could reverse vascular plaque buildup.

== Efficacy in humans ==
The first examination of using the mutant ApoA-I in humans was conducted through a three way collaboration between the University of Milan and the companies Pharmacia and Upjohn in 1996, focusing on treatment of atherosclerosis.

The ApoA-I Milano Trial, published in JAMA in 2003, was the first published placebo controlled, 2 dose level, trial in humans. This was a secondary prevention trial in that those included were individuals who presented to a participating hospital with unstable angina and agreed to consent to a rigorous trial, well beyond usual clinical practice testing and treatment, testing whether this HDL protein variant, which was so effective in animals, would also work in humans. This trial was initiated by Steven Nissen of the Cleveland Clinic after prompting by Roger Newton of Esperion to examine the effects of the mutant protein using intravascular ultrasound imaging. Esperion provided the protein, code named ETC-216, for the duration of the trial.

== Use as treatment ==
Due to its potential efficacy, it was speculated that development of synthetic ApoA-I Milano might be a key factor in eradicating coronary heart disease.

Esperion Therapeutics, a high tech venture capital start-up, demonstrated efficacy in both animals and humans, spending many millions of dollars over several years to conduct a single human trial which showed impressive and rapid efficacy by IVUS of coronary arteries. However, over the course of the project they produced only enough ApoA-I Milano to partially treat thirty out of the forty-five people in the randomized trial, giving them one weekly dose each for five weeks. The results of the trial were published in JAMA (November 5, 2003).

Currently, no drugs based on ApoA-1 Milano are commercially available. Rights to ApoA-I Milano were acquired in 2003 by Pfizer. Clinically known as ETC-216, Pfizer did not move trials forward, probably because the complex protein is very expensive to produce and must be administered intravenously, limiting its application compared to oral medications.

== Subsequent Development ==
Pfizer, after the CETP agent torcetrapib failed in a large human safety trial, decided to exit the cardiovascular market in 2008, though they continue to market Lipitor aggressively.

Esperion, divested by Pfizer in 2008, is back in business and continue to work on HDL mimetic therapies. The company established an agreement with TransGenRx as a protein source.

Calgary-based SemBioSys Genetics Inc. was a biotechnology company that was using Safflower to develop commercial quantities of ApoA-I Milano. On October 11, 2011, SemBioSys Genetics signed a multi-product commercialization and platform collaboration agreement with Tasly Pharmaceuticals of Tianjin (China). In May 2012, SemBioSys terminated its operations and announced that Tasly had terminated their agreement.

On 22 December 2009 The Medicines Company announced it had entered into an exclusive worldwide licensing agreement with Pfizer Inc. for ApoA-I Milano which it then renamed MDCO-216.

On the 12th of July 2010 The Medicines Company signed a pharmaceutical development and manufacturing contract with OctoPlus (Netherlands-based drug delivery and drug development company) to perform process development and clinical manufacturing of MDCO-216. After a trial study failed to produce significant enough results compared to other drugs being tested, in 2016 The Medicines Company discontinued development of MDCO-216.

Cardigant Medical is a Los Angeles-based biotech company that worked to commercialize ApoA-I Milano to treat various vascular diseases. As of 2025, no new trials or commercialisation have been reported, and the web domain of the company website (http://www.cardigant.com) has expired.
