= Nanodisc =

Synthetic model membrane system

Schematic illustration of a MSP nanodisc with a 7-transmembrane protein embedded. Diameter is about 10 nm. Picture from Sligar Lab

A nanodisc is a synthetic model membrane system which assists in the study of membrane proteins. Nanodiscs are discoidal proteins in which a lipid bilayer is surrounded by molecules that are amphipathic molecules including proteins, peptides, and synthetic polymers. It is composed of a lipid bilayer of phospholipids with the hydrophobic edge screened by two amphipathic proteins. These proteins are called membrane scaffolding proteins (MSP) and align in double belt formation. Nanodiscs are structurally very similar to discoidal high-density lipoproteins (HDL) and the MSPs are modified versions of apolipoprotein A1 (apoA1), the main constituent in HDL. Nanodiscs are useful in the study of membrane proteins because they can solubilise and stabilise membrane proteins and represent a more native environment than liposomes, detergent micelles, bicelles and amphipols.

The art of making nanodiscs has progressed past using only the MSPs and lipids to make particles, leading to alternative strategies like peptide nanodiscs that use simpler proteins and synthetic nanodiscs that do not need any proteins for stabilization.

== MSP nanodisc ==
The original nanodisc was produced by apoA1-derived MSPs from 2002. The size and stability of these discs depend on the size of these proteins, which can be adjusted by truncation and fusion. In general, MSP1 proteins consist of one repeat, and MSP2s are double-sized.

== Peptide nanodisc ==
In peptide nanodiscs, the lipid bilayer is screened by amphipathic peptides instead of two MSPs. Peptide nanodiscs are structurally similar to MSP nanodiscs and the peptides also align in a double belt. They can stabilise membrane proteins, but have higher polydispersity and are structurally less stable than MSP nanodiscs. Recent studies, however, showed that dimerization and polymerization of the peptides make them more stable.

== Synthetic/native nanodisc ==
Another way to mimic the native lipid membrane are synthetic polymers. Styrene-maleic acid co-polymers (SMAs) called SMALPs or Lipodisq and Diisobutylene-maleic acid (DIBMA) are such synthetic polymers (DIBMALPs). They can solubilize membrane proteins directly from cells or raw extract. They also have been used to study the lipid composition of several organisms. It was discovered that all synthetic polymers which contained a styrene and maleic acid group can solubilize proteins. These SMA nanoparticles have also been tested as possible drug delivery vehicle and for the study of folding, post-translational modifications and lipid interactions of membrane proteins by native mass spectrometry. They are now routinely used to solve membrane protein structures for cryo-EM, such as the aerolysin pore-forming toxins (2.1Å resolution), where some lipid density was modelled and key interactions relevant for the understanding of pore formation mechanism, its correct positioning and anchoring in the membrane were elucidated.
