= SNTB2 =

Protein-coding gene in the species Homo sapiens

Identifiers
- Aliases: SNTB2, D16S2531E, EST25263, SNT2B2, SNT3, SNTL, syntrophin beta 2
- External IDs: OMIM: 600027; MGI: 101771; GeneCards: SNTB2
Available structures
PDB	Ortholog search: PDBe RCSB
PDB	List of PDB id codes 2VRF

Gene location (Human)
Chr.	Chromosome 16 (human)
Band	16q22.1	Start	69,187,147 bp
Band	16q22.1	End	69,309,052 bp

Gene location (Mouse)
Chr.	Chromosome 8 (mouse)
Band	8 D3|8 53.38 cM	Start	107,662,382 bp
Band	8 D3|8 53.38 cM	End	107,746,346 bp
RNA expression pattern
Bgee	Human / Mouse (ortholog); Top expressed in: tibia; parietal pleura; nipple; synovial joint; retinal pigment epithelium; vena cava; skin of hip; lactiferous duct; pericardium; urethra / Top expressed in: lumbar spinal ganglion; gastrula; aortic valve; ascending aorta; epithelium of lens; calvaria; decidua; endothelial cell of lymphatic vessel; mesenteric lymph nodes; retinal pigment epithelium; More reference expression data
BioGPS	n/a
Orthologs
Databases	NCBI: entry; OMA: entry
Species	Human	Mouse
Entrez	6645	20650
Ensembl	ENSG00000168807; ENSG00000260873	ENSMUSG00000041308
UniProt	Q13425	Q61235
RefSeq (mRNA)	NM_130845; NM_006750	NM_009229; NM_001368316
RefSeq (protein)	NP_006741; NP_006741.1	NP_033255; NP_001355245
Location (UCSC)	Chr 16: 69.19 – 69.31 Mb	Chr 8: 107.66 – 107.75 Mb
PubMed search
- Wikidata
View/Edit Human	View/Edit Mouse

Beta-2-syntrophin is a protein that in humans is encoded by the SNTB2 gene.

== Function ==
Dystrophin is a large, rod-like cytoskeletal protein found at the inner surface of muscle fibers. Dystrophin is missing in Duchenne muscular dystrophy patients and is present in reduced amounts in Becker muscular dystrophy patients. The protein encoded by this gene is a peripheral membrane protein found associated with dystrophin and dystrophin-related proteins. This gene is a member of the syntrophin gene family, which contains at least two other structurally related genes.

== Interactions ==
SNTB2 has been shown to interact with ABCA1.
