= NAXD =

Protein-coding gene in humans

Identifiers
- Aliases: NAXD, LP3298, CARKD, NAD(P)HX dehydratase, PEBEL2
- External IDs: OMIM: 615910; MGI: 1913353; GeneCards: NAXD
Enzyme activity
EC #	BRENDA	ExPASy	KEGG	MetaCyc
4.2.1.93	↗	↗	↗	↗

Gene location (Human)
Chr.	Chromosome 13 (human)
Band	13q34	Start	110,615,545 bp
Band	13q34	End	110,639,996 bp

Gene location (Mouse)
Chr.	Chromosome 8 (mouse)
Band	8|8 A1.1	Start	11,547,506 bp
Band	8|8 A1.1	End	11,564,960 bp
RNA expression pattern
Bgee	Human / Mouse (ortholog); Top expressed in: cardia; left ovary; right adrenal cortex; pylorus; right lobe of liver; renal medulla; right ovary; postcentral gyrus; left adrenal gland; left adrenal cortex / Top expressed in: interventricular septum; epithelium of lens; transitional epithelium of urinary bladder; renal corpuscle; right kidney; lacrimal gland; fossa; Epithelium of choroid plexus; proximal tubule; condyle; More reference expression data
BioGPS	n/a
Gene ontology
Molecular function	nucleotide binding; protein binding; ATP binding; ADP-dependent NAD(P)H-hydrate dehydratase activity; lyase activity; ATP-dependent NAD(P)H-hydrate dehydratase activity; molecular function
Cellular component	mitochondrion; mitochondrial matrix; cellular component
Biological process	NAD biosynthesis via nicotinamide riboside salvage pathway; biological process; nicotinamide nucleotide metabolic process
Sources:Amigo / QuickGO
Orthologs
Databases	NCBI: entry; OMA: entry
Species	Human	Mouse
Entrez	55739	69225
Ensembl	ENSG00000213995	ENSMUSG00000031505
UniProt	Q8IW45	Q9CZ42
RefSeq (mRNA)	NM_001242881; NM_001242882; NM_001242883; NM_018210	NM_001190357; NM_001293661; NM_026995
RefSeq (protein)	NP_001229810; NP_001229811; NP_001229812; NP_060680	NP_001177286; NP_001280590; NP_081271; NP_001389565
Location (UCSC)	Chr 13: 110.62 – 110.64 Mb	Chr 8: 11.55 – 11.56 Mb
PubMed search
- Wikidata
View/Edit Human	View/Edit Mouse

Carbohydrate kinase
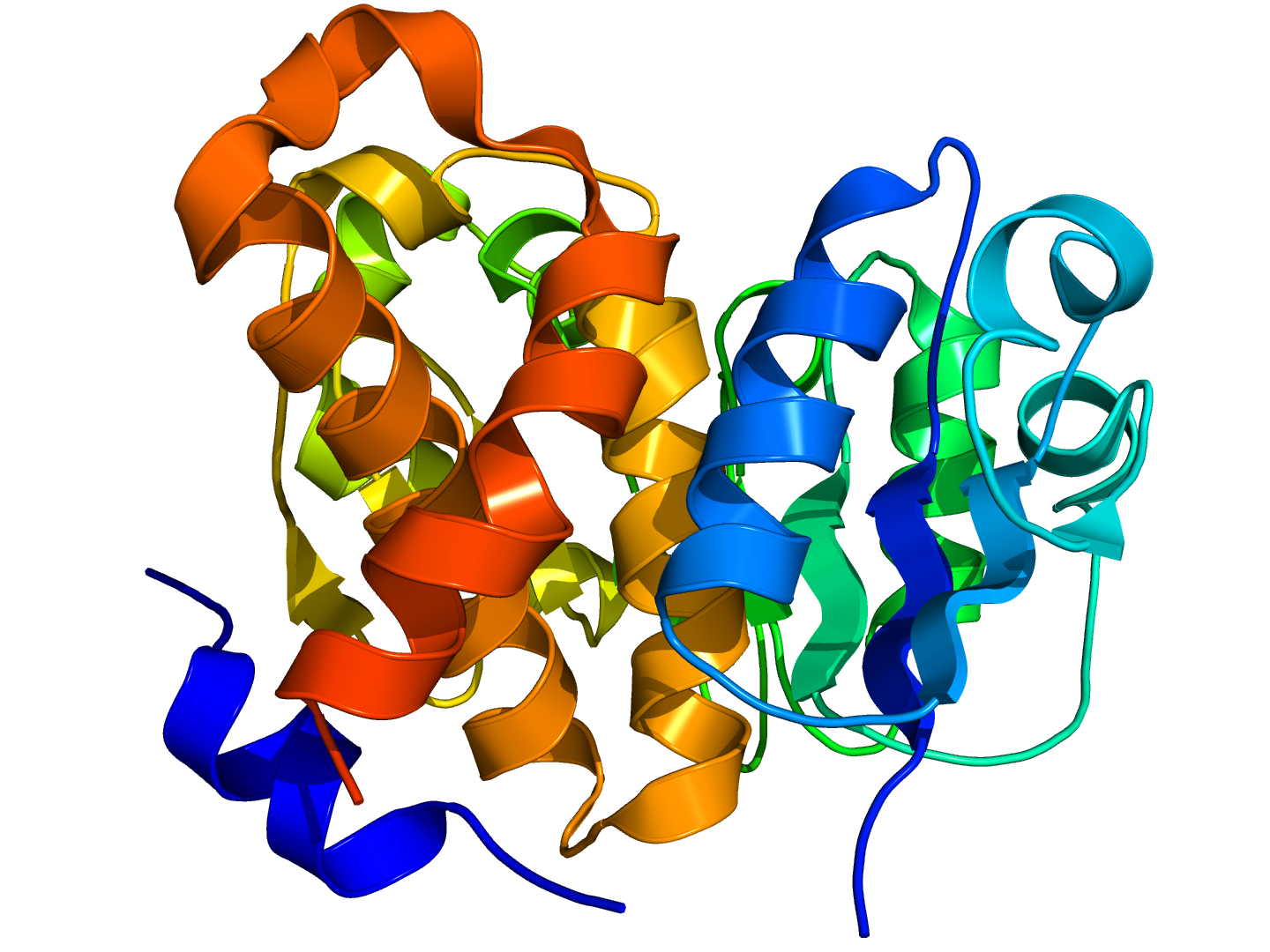
- Crystallographic structure of a putative Bacillus subtilis carbohydrate kinase (rainbow colored, N-terminus = blue, C-terminus = red).

Identifiers
- Symbol: Carb_kinase
- Pfam: PF01256
- Pfam clan: CL0118
- InterPro: IPR000631
- PROSITE: PDOC00806
- SCOP2: 1kyh / SCOPe / SUPFAM
Available protein structures:
- PDB: 1kyh, 2ax3 IPR000631 PF01256 (ECOD; PDBsum)
- AlphaFold: IPR000631; PF01256

NAD(P)HX dehydratase is an enzyme that in humans is encoded by the NAXD gene (previously CARKD). The NAXD protein is a ATP-dependent NAD(P)H-hydrate dehydratase enzyme that is involved in repairing NAD(P)HX, a type of damaged NAD(P)H.

== Gene ==
Human CARKD gene has 10 exons and resides on Chromosome 13 at q34. The following genes are near CARKD on the chromosome:

- COL4A2: A2 Subunit of type IV collagen
- RAB20: Potential regulator of Connexin 43 trafficking.
- CARS2: Mitochondrial Cystienyl-tRNA Synthetase 2
- ING1: Tumor-Suppressor Protein

== Tissue distribution ==
CARKD appears to be ubiquitously expressed at high levels. Expression data in the human protein, and the mouse ortholog, indicate its expression in almost all tissues. One peculiar expression pattern of CARKD is its differential expression through the development of oligodendrocytes. Its expression is lower in oligodendrocyte progenitor cells than in mature oligodendrocytes.

== Structure ==
This protein is part of the phosphomethylpyrimidine kinase: ribokinase / pfkB superfamily. This family is characterized by the presence of a domain shared by the family. CARKD contains a carbohydrate kinase domain (Pfam PF01256). This family is related to Pfam PF02210 and Pfam PF00294 implying that it also is a carbohydrate kinase.

== Predicted properties ==
The following properties of CARKD were predicted using bioinformatic analysis:

- Molecular Weight: 41.4 KDal
- Isoelectric point: 9.377
  - CARKD orthologs have highly variable isoelectric points.
- Post-translational modification: Three post-translational modifications are predicted:
  - Modified Phosphotyrosine Residue
  - Two N-Linked Glycosylation Sites
- A Signal Peptide and signal peptide cleavage site was predicted.

== Binding partners ==
The human protein apolipoprotein A-1 binding precursor (APOA1BP) was predicted to be a binding partner for CARKD. This prediction is based on co-occurrence across genomes and co-expression. In addition to these data, the orthologs of CARKD in E. coli contain a domain similar to APOA1BP. This indicates that the two proteins are likely to have originated from a common evolutionary ancestor and, according to Rosetta stone analysis theory, are likely interaction partners even in species such as humans where the two proteins are not produced as a single polypeptide.

== Clinical significance ==
Based on allele-specific expression of CARKD, CARKD may play a role in acute lymphoblastic leukemia. In addition, microarray data indicates that CARKD is up-regulated in Glioblastoma multiforme tumors.

Mutations of the NAXD gene cause the rare disease early-onset progressive encephalopathy with brain edema and/or leukoencephalopathy-2 (PEBEL2).
