= Blood stasis =

Concept in traditional Chinese medicine

Blood stasis (also blood stagnation and blood stasis syndrome) (BS) is a concept in traditional Chinese medicine (TCM), described as a slowing or pooling of the blood due to a disruption of heart qi. Blood stasis is also described by practitioners of TCM in terms of yin deficiency, qi deficiency and qi stagnation. For non-practitioners of TCM it is sometimes explained in terms of hematological disorders such as hemorrhage, congestion, thrombosis or local ischemia, and in terms of tissue changes. TCM practitioners believe it is an important underlying pathology of many disease processes despite the fact that objective, consistent methods for measuring the presence of blood stasis syndrome are not readily available. Blood stasis is associated with justifications for acupuncture and herbal treatments.

== History ==
Practitioners of TCM believe that descriptions of BS can be traced back to the Inner Canon of Huangdi (about 200 B.C.E. in China) and understanding of it evolved with the practice of traditional East Asia medicine (TEAM), however there were no standard diagnostic criteria until the 1980s. Despite this the diagnosis of BS was applied to both chronic internal diseases and external injuries with treatment involving "activating blood circulation to dissipate blood stasis."

Standard diagnostic criteria for BS were first established in 1982 in China by the Specialized Committee of "activating blood circulation" and in Japan by Terasawa et al in 1983. These criteria were revised in 1988 in China with the "diagnostic criteria of Blood-stasis symptom-complex" and Terasawa revised the diagnostic criteria in Japan in 1989.

Since 1989 research conducted by TCM practitioners on BS and its treatment has increased and some of this research has shown correlations between BS and abnormal coagulation function, inflammation, and accelerated red blood cell senescence. This increase in research has also highlighted the inconsistencies of BS diagnostic criteria.

Amongst practitioners of TCM and related fields covered by the general term traditional East Asia medicine (TEAM) there is a large body of research on blood stasis. A survey conducted in 2014 amongst practitioners of traditional Korean medicine found that more than half of the respondents still had difficulties with the diagnosis of BS because "objective measurement methods were not readily available" despite, or perhaps because, the diagnostic criteria for BS is regularly revised.

East Asian nations encourage and reward the use of TCM for all ailments, including COVID-19. As an example, pharmacologist Li Lianda received a National Science and Technology Progress Award in 2018 from the People's Republic of China for his work on the scientific explanation of BS and the basic laws and mechanism of action of "activating blood circulation and removing blood stasis".

Notwithstanding the 'criticisms' below, there is a considerable degree of overlap between the presence of fibrinaloid microclots in blood and the various diseases considered to involve blood stasis syndrome. As a result, beneficial effects (cited therein) have regularly been shown using suitable cocktails of herbs used in Chinese Herbal Medicine and the equivalent Japanese Kampo, where blood stasis is known as Oketsu.

== Criticism ==
Blood stasis, as defined within TCM, is a pseudo-scientific concept and uses other pseudo-scientific or mystical concepts such as qi, meridians, acupuncture, yin and yang as part of its description. The concept of BS is also based on incorrect knowledge regarding human physiology, in particular the liver. "The Liver stores Blood ... when a person moves, Blood goes to the channels, when at rest it goes to the Liver" and "Blood volume problems indirectly influences our resistance to external pathogenic factors. If this Liver function is normal, the skin and muscles will be well nourished by Blood and be able to resist attacks of exterior pathogenic factors." Mark Crislip, infectious disease doctor, referred to these quotes as "gibberish" in a 2015 Science-Based Medicine article.

Crislip also mentions that "Many researchers are trying to shoehorn BS into vascular diseases such as angina and lipid disorders." He referred to the characteristic symptoms of BS "such as pain in a fixed position, nyctalgia, dark-purple coloring of the tongue or face, infraorbital darkness, sublingual varicosis, blood spots under the skin or tongue, or an astringent pulse" and the attempt to link BS with conditions such as "ischemic heart disease, cerebral vascular accident, diabetes mellitus, chronic gastritis, chronic renal failure, chronic hepatitis, trauma, and dysmenorrhea" as nonsense. He stated that:

"Like so much of the TCPM research, time and money is being devoted to validate with modernity BS concepts that are fundamentally grounded in fantasy."

== Purported mechanism of action ==
In TCM, the spleen and kidneys govern the movement and transformation of qi and fluid and these organs cooperate with each other to participate in the metabolism of water. A functional disorder of the spleen or kidneys would lead to qi stagnation and blood stasis.

Some causes of blood stasis are believed to include: too little nutrients, too much sugar, too little sleep, too much alcohol, lack of movement, too much movement (over-training), emotional stress, trauma, heat in the body, and cold in the body. Recommendations to improve blood flow include not eating while stressed, not eating too fast, breathing, focusing on gratitude while eating, not overeating, avoiding cold foods, avoiding damp foods (peanuts, soy and dairy), eating more of eggplants, cayenne, garlic, ginger, turmeric, shiitake, saffron, vinegar, etc. Treatments include acupuncture, cupping, electrical acupuncture and herbal remedies. A recent review suggests that insoluble 'fibrinaloid' microclots may be a cause, consistent with the utility of the herbal formula XueFu Zhuyu for treating blood stasis.
