= Tangier disease =

- Other names: Familial alpha-lipoprotein deficiency
- Specialty: Endocrinology

Tangier disease or hypoalphalipoproteinemia is an extremely rare inherited disorder characterized by a severe reduction in the amount of high density lipoprotein (HDL), often referred to as "good cholesterol", in the bloodstream. Worldwide, approximately 100 cases have even been identified.

The disorder was originally discovered on Tangier Island off the coast of Virginia, but has now been identified in people from many countries.

== Signs and symptoms ==
Individuals that are homozygotes for Tangier's disease develop various cholesterol ester depositions. These are especially visible in the tonsils, as they may appear yellow/orange. The cholesterol esters may also be found in lymph nodes, bone marrow, the liver and spleen.

Due to the cholesterol ester depositions the tonsils may be enlarged. Hepatosplenomegaly (enlarged liver and spleen) is common.

Neuropathy and cardiovascular disease are the most devastating developments caused by Tangier's disease.

== Genetics ==
Tangier disease has an autosomal recessive pattern of inheritance.

Mutations to chromosome 9q31 lead to a defective ABCA1 transporter. These mutations prevent the ABCA1 protein from effectively transporting cholesterol and phospholipids out of cells for pickup by ApoA1 in the bloodstream. This inability to transport cholesterol out of cells leads to a deficiency of high-density lipoproteins in the circulation, which is a risk factor for coronary artery disease. Additionally, the buildup of cholesterol in cells can be toxic, causing cell death or impaired function. These combined factors lead to the signs and symptoms of Tangier disease.

This condition is inherited in an autosomal recessive pattern, meaning that for the phenotype to appear, two copies of the gene must be present in the genotype. Most often, the parents of an individual with an autosomal recessive disorder are carriers of one copy of the altered gene but do not show signs and symptoms of the disorder.

== Diagnosis ==
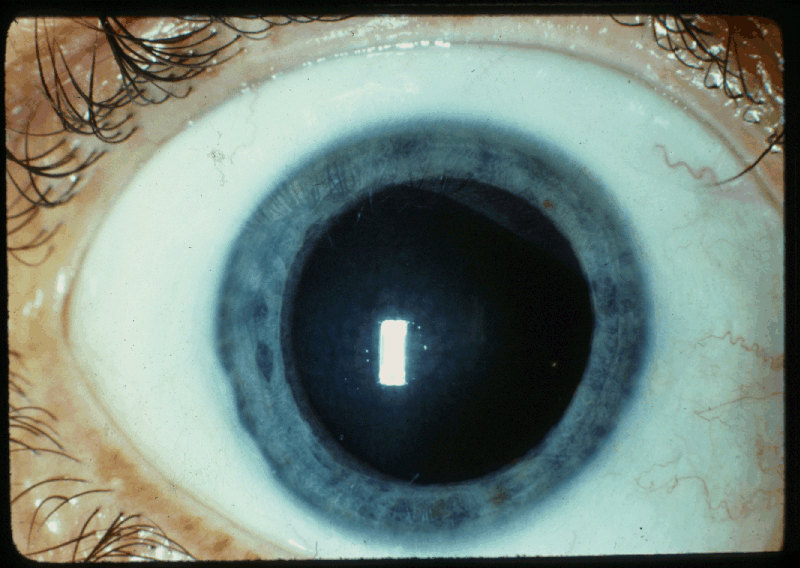
Diffuse hazy opacity of the right cornea in a patient with Tangier disease.

Tangier disease results in familial high-density lipoprotein deficiency. High-density lipoproteins are created when a protein in the bloodstream, Apolipoprotein A1 (apoA1), combines with cholesterol and phospholipids. The cholesterol and phospholipids used to form HDL originate from inside cells but are transported out of the cell into the blood via the ABCA1 transporter. People with Tangier disease have defective ABCA1 transporters resulting in a greatly reduced ability to transport cholesterol out of their cells, which leads to an accumulation of cholesterol and phospholipids in many body tissues, which can cause them to increase in size. Reduced blood levels of high-density lipoproteins is sometimes described as hypoalphalipoproteinemia.

People affected by this condition also have slightly elevated amounts of fat in the blood (mild hypertriglyceridemia) and disturbances in nerve function (neuropathy). The tonsils are visibly affected by this disorder; they frequently appear orange or yellow and are extremely enlarged. Affected people often develop premature atherosclerosis, which is characterized by fatty deposits and scar-like tissue lining the arteries. Other signs of this condition may include an enlarged spleen (splenomegaly), an enlarged liver (hepatomegaly), clouding of the cornea, and early-onset cardiovascular disease.

== Treatment ==
There are drugs that can increase serum HDL such as niacin or gemfibrozil. While these drugs are useful for patients with hyperlipidemia, Tangier's disease patients do not benefit from these pharmaceutical interventions.

Therefore, the only current treatment modality for Tangier's disease is diet modification. A low-fat diet can reduce some of the symptoms, especially those involving neuropathies.

== History ==
In 1959, a five-year-old patient named Teddy Laird from Tangier Island, Virginia, presented with strikingly large and yellow-orange tonsils which were removed by armed forces physicians. After initial diagnosis with Niemann-Pick he was transferred to Dr. Louis Avioli at the National Cancer Institute. Donald Fredrickson, then head of the Molecular Disease Branch, became aware of the case and had a hunch that the original diagnosis was incorrect. In 1960, he traveled with Dr. Avioli to Tangier Island for further investigation. After finding the same symptom in Teddy's sister, an investigation revealed an extremely high number of foam cells (cholesterol ester-laden macrophages) in not only the tonsils, but also in a wide range of tissues, including the bone marrow and spleen. During a second trip to the island, they found that the family had very low levels of HDL cholesterol, suggesting a genetic basis of the disease.
