= Peptitergents =

Peptitergents (a portmanteau of peptide and detergent) are synthetic peptides designed to be lipophilic on one side and hydrophilic on the other upon folding to an α-helical conformation and were designed to solubilize integral membrane proteins in aqueous solution. They can be considered a sub-class of amphipols and are based on earlier fundamental explorations of amphiphilic secondary structures

== See also ==
- Amphipols
