= Li Lianda =

Chinese pharmacologist and paediatrician (1934–2018)

- 李连达
- Born: 24 July 1934; Shenyang, Fengtian province, Manchukuo
- Died: 18 October 2018 (aged 84); Beijing, China
- Education: Beijing Medical College
- Scientific career
- Fields: Traditional Chinese medicine
- Institutions: China Academy of Chinese Medical Sciences

Chinese name
- Traditional Chinese: 李連達
- Simplified Chinese: 李连达
Transcriptions
Standard Mandarin
- Hanyu Pinyin: Lǐ Liándá

Li Lianda (Chinese: 李连达; 24 July 1934 – 18 October 2018) was a Chinese pharmacologist and paediatrician with the China Academy of Chinese Medical Sciences. He was an academician of the Chinese Academy of Engineering and served as Dean of the School of Pharmacy of Zhejiang University.

== Biography ==
Li was born on 24 July 1934 in Shenyang, Liaoning, China. After graduating from Beijing Medical College in 1956, he worked at Xiyuan Hospital, which is affiliated with the China Academy of Chinese Medical Sciences (CACMS), and practiced as a paediatrician for 18 years.

In 1974, Li began researching on the pharmacology of traditional Chinese medicine. He later served as Director of Basic Medical Research at Xiyuan Hospital, and chief scientist at the CACMS. His research on the scientific basis of the traditional Chinese medical concept of blood stasis won the National Science and Technology Progress Award, First Class. He also pioneered a new procedure to treat coronary artery disease using a combination of Chinese medicine and stem cells, which won the China Medical Society Science and Technology Award, First Class.

Li was elected an academician of the Chinese Academy of Engineering in 2003. From 2004 to 2009, he served as Dean of the School of Pharmacy of Zhejiang University in Hangzhou.

On 18 October 2018, Li died in Beijing at the age of 84.

== Controversies ==
In 2008, Li was implicated in an academic scandal at Zhejiang University. A postdoctoral researcher at the School of Pharmacy, He Haibo (贺海波), was found to have published 14 articles in international journals that used falsified or plagiarized data, and Li was listed as a co-author. He Haibo admitted wrongdoing and said that he had submitted the articles using Li's name without his permission. An investigation by the university cleared Li of wrongdoing, and He Haibo, by then an associate professor, was fired. Li took personal responsibility for his lax supervision of He, although he said that his busy schedule which required him to spend most of his time in Beijing and his lack of English proficiency impeded his ability to scrutinize He's articles that were written in English.

In 2009, Li was involved in a dispute with the Chinese pharmaceutical company Tasly when he claimed that a key product made by Tasly was unsafe. Tasly sued Li in 2013, alleging that Li's claim was baseless and was motivated by his financial and employment relations with Guangzhou Pharmaceutical, a direct competitor of Tasly. In September 2014, the Tianjin High People's Court ruled in favour of Tasly and ordered Li to issue an apology and pay Tasly 300,000 yuan in compensation.
