= Amphipols =

Amphiphilic polymers

Amphipols (a portmanteau of amphiphilic polymers) are a class of amphiphilic polymers designed to keep membrane proteins soluble in water without the need for detergents, which are traditionally used to this end but tend to be denaturing. Amphipols adsorb onto the hydrophobic transmembrane surface of membrane proteins thanks to their hydrophobic moieties and keep the complexes thus formed water-soluble thanks to the hydrophilic ones. Amphipol-trapped membrane proteins are, as a rule, much more stable than detergent-solubilized ones, which facilitates their study by most biochemical and biophysical approaches. Amphipols can be used to fold denatured membrane proteins to their native form and have proven particularly precious in the field of single-particle electron cryo-microscopy (cryo-EM; see e.g.).The properties and uses of amphipols and other non-conventional surfactants are the subject of a book by Jean-Luc Popot.

== See also ==
- Peptitergents - synthetic peptide sequences which can substitute to detergents to keep membrane proteins water-soluble.
- Nanodisc - water-soluble protein-stabilized lipid discs that can trap and stabilize membrane proteins.
