= GPLD1 =

Protein-coding gene in the species Homo sapiens

Identifiers
- Aliases: GPLD1, GPIPLD, GPIPLDM, PIGPLD, PIPLD, glycosylphosphatidylinositol specific phospholipase D1
- External IDs: OMIM: 602515; MGI: 106604; HomoloGene: 1152; GeneCards: GPLD1; OMA:GPLD1 - orthologs

Gene location (Human)
Chr.	Chromosome 6 (human)
Band	6p22.3	Start	24,424,565 bp
Band	6p22.3	End	24,495,205 bp

Gene location (Mouse)
Chr.	Chromosome 13 (mouse)
Band	13 A3.1|13 10.79 cM	Start	25,127,135 bp
Band	13 A3.1|13 10.79 cM	End	25,176,484 bp
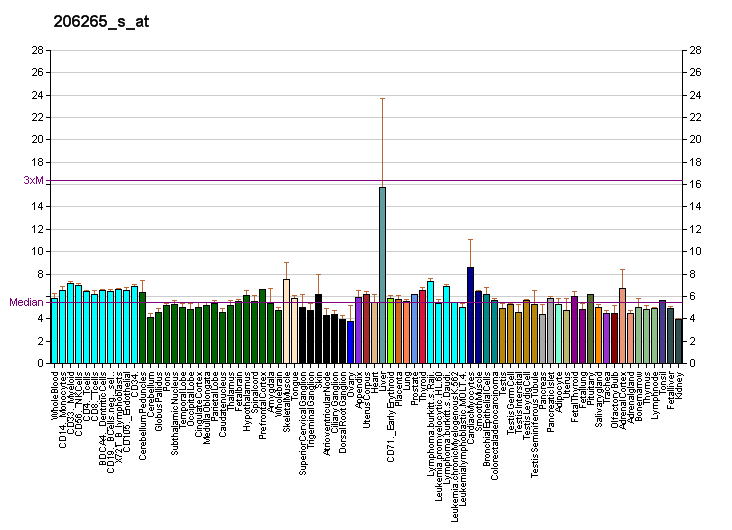

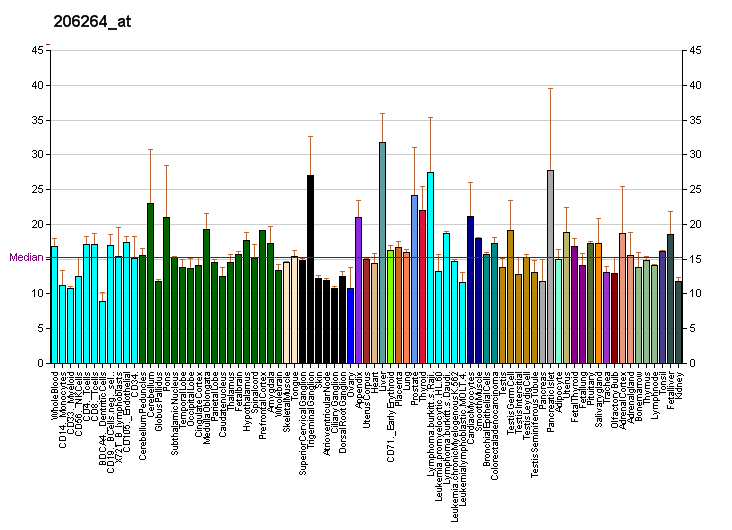

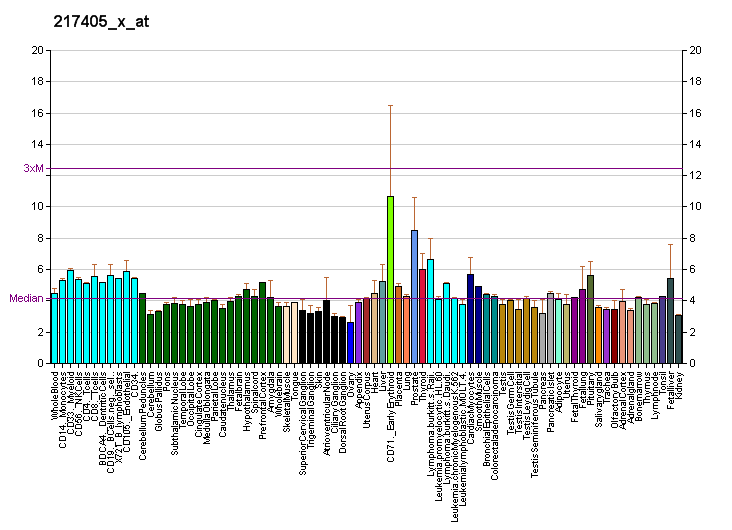
RNA expression pattern
Bgee	Human / Mouse (ortholog); Top expressed in: secondary oocyte; human penis; liver; buccal mucosa cell; right lobe of liver; right hemisphere of cerebellum; skin of thigh; testicle; gonad; Descending thoracic aorta / Top expressed in: left lobe of liver; utricle; dorsal tegmental nucleus; dorsomedial hypothalamic nucleus; transitional epithelium of urinary bladder; mammillary body; arcuate nucleus; paraventricular nucleus of hypothalamus; esophagus; lumbar subsegment of spinal cord; More reference expression data
BioGPS	More reference expression data
Gene ontology
Molecular function	sodium channel regulator activity; phospholipase D activity; glycosylphosphatidylinositol phospholipase D activity; hydrolase activity
Cellular component	cytoplasm; intracellular membrane-bounded organelle; intracellular anatomical structure; lysosomal membrane; extracellular exosome; extracellular region; extracellular space; extracellular matrix
Biological process	cellular response to calcium ion; insulin receptor signaling pathway; positive regulation of triglyceride biosynthetic process; positive regulation of high-density lipoprotein particle clearance; chondrocyte differentiation; ossification; cellular response to triglyceride; hematopoietic stem cell migration to bone marrow; positive regulation of membrane protein ectodomain proteolysis; positive regulation of glucose metabolic process; hematopoietic stem cell migration; response to glucose; cellular response to cholesterol; cell migration involved in sprouting angiogenesis; transepithelial transport; positive regulation of endothelial cell migration; GPI anchor release; positive regulation of cytolysis; cellular response to pH; positive regulation of secretion; regulation of cellular response to insulin stimulus; positive regulation of alkaline phosphatase activity; cellular response to insulin stimulus; complement receptor mediated signaling pathway; positive regulation of apoptotic process; positive regulation of insulin secretion involved in cellular response to glucose stimulus; negative regulation of triglyceride catabolic process; phosphatidylcholine metabolic process; negative regulation of cell population proliferation; C-terminal protein lipidation
Sources:Amigo / QuickGO
Orthologs
Species	Human	Mouse
Entrez	2822	14756
Ensembl	ENSG00000112293	ENSMUSG00000021340
UniProt	P80108	O70362
RefSeq (mRNA)	NM_001503; NM_177483	NM_008156
RefSeq (protein)	NP_001494	n/a
Location (UCSC)	Chr 6: 24.42 – 24.5 Mb	Chr 13: 25.13 – 25.18 Mb
PubMed search
- Wikidata
View/Edit Human	View/Edit Mouse

Phosphatidylinositol-glycan-specific phospholipase D is an enzyme that in humans is encoded by the GPLD1 gene.

Many proteins are tethered to the extracellular face of eukaryotic plasma membranes by a glycosylphosphatidylinositol (GPI) anchor. The GPI-anchor is a glycolipid found on many blood cells. The protein encoded by the GPLD1 gene is a GPI degrading enzyme that hydrolyzes the inositol phosphate linkage in proteins anchored by phosphatidylinositol glycans, thereby releasing the attached protein from the plasma membrane.

Plasma concentrations of Gpld1 in mice were found to increase after exercise and to correlate with improved cognitive function, and concentrations of GPLD1 in blood were increased in active elderly humans.

== Interactions ==
GPLD1 has been shown to interact with Apolipoprotein A1 and APOA4.
