= ATP-dependent NAD(P)H-hydrate dehydratase =

Identifiers
- EC no.: 4.2.1.93

Databases
- BRENDA: enzyme data
- ExPASy: NiceZyme view
- KEGG: enzyme entry
- MetaCyc: metabolic pathway
- Rhea: reactions
- PDB structures: RCSB PDB PDBe PDBsum
- Gene Ontology: AmiGO / QuickGO
Search
- PMC: articles
- PubMed: articles
- NCBI: proteins

The enzyme ATP-dependent NAD(P)H-hydrate dehydratase (EC 4.2.1.93) catalyzes the chemical reactions

ATP + (6S)-6-β-hydroxy-1,4,5,6-tetrahydronicotinamide-adenine dinucleotide $\rightleftharpoons$ ADP + phosphate + NADH
ATP + (6S)-6-β-hydroxy-1,4,5,6-tetrahydronicotinamide-adenine dinucleotide phosphate $\rightleftharpoons$ ADP + phosphate + NADPH

In humans, this enzyme is encoded by the gene NAXD. This enzyme belongs to the family of lyases, specifically the hydro-lyases, which cleave carbon-oxygen bonds. The systematic name of this enzyme class is (6S)-6-β-hydroxy-1,4,5,6-tetrahydronicotinamide-adenine-dinucleotide hydro-lyase (ATP-hydrolysing; NADH-forming). Other names in common use include reduced nicotinamide adenine dinucleotide hydrate dehydratase, ATP-dependent H4NAD(P)+OH dehydratase, (6S)-β-6-hydroxy-1,4,5,6-tetrahydronicotinamide-adenine-, and dinucleotide hydro-lyase (ATP-hydrolysing).
