= Apolipoprotein AI =

Protein used in lipid metabolism

APOA1
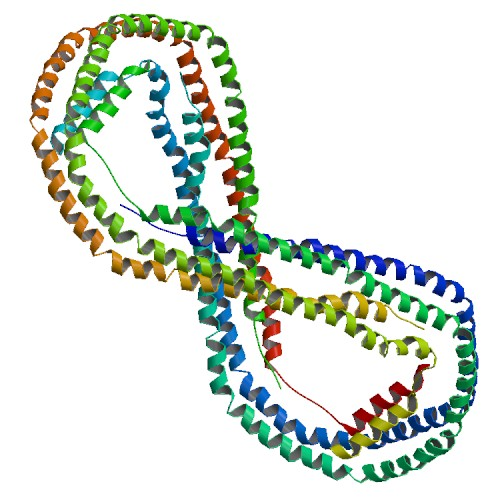

Identifiers
- Aliases: APOA1, entrez:335, apo(a), apolipoprotein A1, Apolipoprotein A-I, HPALP2
- External IDs: OMIM: 107680; MGI: 88049; GeneCards: APOA1
Available structures
PDB	Ortholog search: PDBe RCSB
PDB	List of PDB id codes 1AV1, 1GW3, 1GW4, 1ODP, 1ODQ, 1ODR, 2A01, 3K2S, 3R2P, 2MSC, 2MSD, 2MSE, 4V6M

Gene location (Human)
Chr.	Chromosome 11 (human)
Band	11q23.3	Start	116,835,751 bp
Band	11q23.3	End	116,837,622 bp

Gene location (Mouse)
Chr.	Chromosome 9 (mouse)
Band	9 A5.2|9 25.36 cM	Start	46,139,878 bp
Band	9 A5.2|9 25.36 cM	End	46,141,764 bp
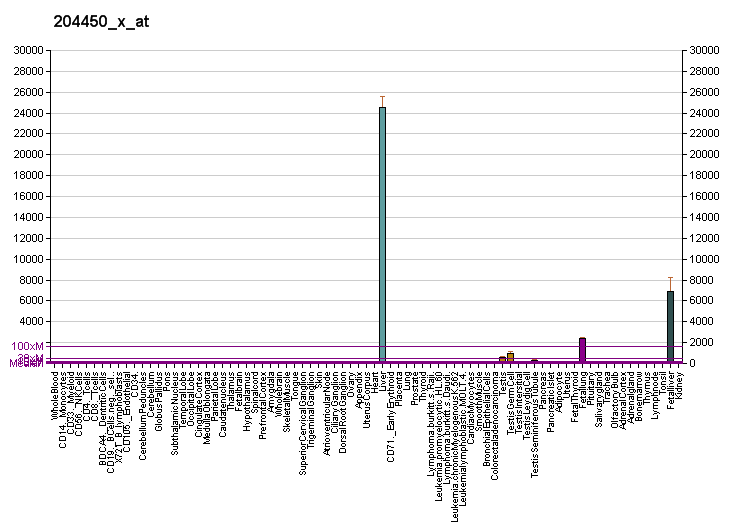

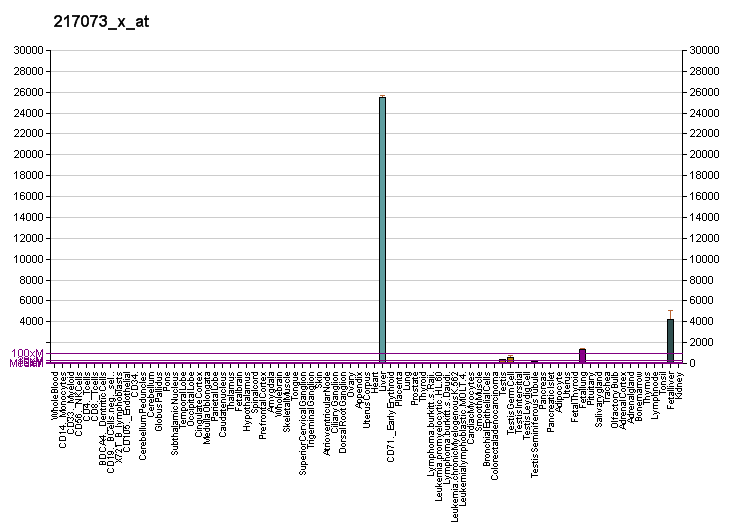
RNA expression pattern
Bgee	Human / Mouse (ortholog); Top expressed in: jejunal mucosa; right lobe of liver; mucosa of ileum; right testis; left testis; duodenum; apex of heart; gonad; left ventricle; amniotic fluid / Top expressed in: left lobe of liver; jejunum; yolk sac; duodenum; epithelium of stomach; gallbladder; ileum; fetal liver hematopoietic progenitor cell; migratory enteric neural crest cell; mucous cell of stomach; More reference expression data
BioGPS	More reference expression data
Gene ontology
Molecular function	lipase inhibitor activity; phosphatidylcholine binding; apolipoprotein receptor binding; high-density lipoprotein particle receptor binding; lipoprotein particle binding; phosphatidylcholine-sterol O-acyltransferase activator activity; phospholipid binding; apolipoprotein A-I receptor binding; enzyme binding; cholesterol transfer activity; amyloid-beta binding; phospholipid transporter activity; protein binding; chemorepellent activity; lipid transporter activity; cholesterol binding; identical protein binding; high-density lipoprotein particle binding; lipid binding; heat shock protein binding; signaling receptor binding
Cellular component	cytosol; endoplasmic reticulum lumen; chylomicron; extracellular region; nucleus; extracellular vesicle; endocytic vesicle lumen; discoidal high-density lipoprotein particle; very-low-density lipoprotein particle; cell surface; secretory granule lumen; extracellular exosome; blood microparticle; endocytic vesicle; plasma membrane; spherical high-density lipoprotein particle; early endosome; high-density lipoprotein particle; cytoplasmic vesicle; extracellular space; low-density lipoprotein particle; intermediate-density lipoprotein particle; collagen-containing extracellular matrix
Biological process	positive regulation of Rho protein signal transduction; regulation of protein phosphorylation; cholesterol import; lipid transport; negative chemotaxis; positive regulation of cholesterol esterification; phospholipid efflux; phospholipid transport; negative regulation of hydrolase activity; receptor-mediated endocytosis; retinoid metabolic process; negative regulation of lipase activity; regulation of intestinal cholesterol absorption; negative regulation of cell adhesion molecule production; peripheral nervous system axon regeneration; endothelial cell proliferation; animal organ regeneration; peptidyl-methionine modification; cholesterol homeostasis; negative regulation of heterotypic cell-cell adhesion; transforming growth factor beta receptor signaling pathway; negative regulation of inflammatory response; phospholipid homeostasis; ERK1 and ERK2 cascade; negative regulation of cytokine production involved in immune response; positive regulation of fatty acid biosynthetic process; high-density lipoprotein particle clearance; lipoprotein metabolic process; G protein-coupled receptor signaling pathway; positive regulation of triglyceride catabolic process; response to nutrient; glucocorticoid metabolic process; lipid storage; protein stabilization; positive regulation of lipoprotein lipase activity; cholesterol metabolic process; response to estrogen; triglyceride catabolic process; transmembrane transport; transport; cholesterol efflux; integrin-mediated signaling pathway; phosphatidylcholine biosynthetic process; neuron projection regeneration; negative regulation of very-low-density lipoprotein particle remodeling; steroid metabolic process; positive regulation of hydrolase activity; regulation of Cdc42 protein signal transduction; blood vessel endothelial cell migration; negative regulation of tumor necrosis factor-mediated signaling pathway; lipid metabolism; cholesterol transport; platelet degranulation; adrenal gland development; high-density lipoprotein particle assembly; negative regulation of response to cytokine stimulus; high-density lipoprotein particle remodeling; positive regulation of substrate adhesion-dependent cell spreading; phospholipid metabolic process; vitamin transport; cholesterol biosynthetic process; positive regulation of stress fiber assembly; triglyceride homeostasis; reverse cholesterol transport; lipoprotein biosynthetic process; positive regulation of cholesterol efflux; regulation of lipid metabolic process; regulation of cholesterol transport; chylomicron remodeling; very-low-density lipoprotein particle remodeling; chylomicron assembly; post-translational protein modification; positive regulation of lipid biosynthetic process; positive regulation of phagocytosis; positive regulation of phospholipid efflux
Sources:Amigo / QuickGO
Orthologs
Databases	NCBI: entry; OMA: entry
Species	Human	Mouse
Entrez	335	11806
Ensembl	ENSG00000118137	ENSMUSG00000032083
UniProt	P02647	Q00623
RefSeq (mRNA)	NM_000039; NM_001318017; NM_001318018; NM_001318021	NM_009692
RefSeq (protein)	NP_000030; NP_001304946; NP_001304947; NP_001304950; NP_000030.1 NP_001304946.1; NP_001304947.1	NP_033822
Location (UCSC)	Chr 11: 116.84 – 116.84 Mb	Chr 9: 46.14 – 46.14 Mb
PubMed search
- Wikidata
View/Edit Human	View/Edit Mouse

Apolipoprotein AI (Apo-AI) is a protein that in humans is encoded by the APOA1 gene. As the major component of high-density lipoprotein (HDL) particles, it has a specific role in lipid metabolism.

== Structure ==
APOA1 is located on chromosome 11, with its specific location being 11q23-q24. The gene contains 4 exons. The encoded apolipoprotein AI, is a 28.1 kDa protein composed of 243 amino acids; 21 peptides have been observed through mass spectrometry data. Due to alternative splicing, there exists multiple transcript variants of APOA1, including at least one which encodes a Apo-AI preprotein.

== Function ==
Apolipoprotein AI is the major protein component of high density lipoprotein (HDL) particles in plasma.

Chylomicrons secreted from the intestinal enterocyte also contain Apo-AI, but it is quickly transferred to HDL in the bloodstream.

The protein, as a component of HDL particles, enables efflux of fat molecules by accepting fats from within cells (including macrophages within the walls of arteries which have become overloaded with ingested fats from oxidized low-density lipoprotein (LDL) particles) for transport (in the water outside cells) elsewhere, including back to LDL particles or to the liver for excretion.

It is a cofactor for lecithin–cholesterol acyltransferase (LCAT) which is responsible for the formation of most plasma cholesteryl esters. Apolipoprotein AI has also been isolated as a prostacyclin (PGI2) stabilizing factor, and thus may have an anticlotting effect. Defects in the gene encoding it are associated with HDL deficiencies, including Tangier disease, and with systemic non-neuropathic amyloidosis.

Apo-AI is often used as a biomarker for prediction of cardiovascular diseases. The ratio apoB-100/apoA-I (i.e. LDL and larger particles vs. HDL particles), NMR measured lipoprotein (LDL/HDL) particle ratios even more so, has always had a stronger correlation with myocardial infarction event rates than older methods of measuring lipid transport in the water outside cells.

Apo-AI is routinely measured using immunoassays such as ELISA or nephelometry.

== Applications ==
Apo-AI can be used to create in vitro lipoprotein nanodiscs for cell-free membrane expression systems.

== Clinical significance ==
=== Activity associated with high HDL-C and protection from heart disease ===
As a major component of the high-density lipoprotein complex (protective "fat removal" particles), Apo-AI helps to clear lipids, including cholesterol, from white blood cells within artery walls, making the white blood cells (WBCs) less likely to become lipid overloaded, transform into foam cells, die and contribute to progressive atheroma. Five of nine men found to carry a mutation (E164X) who were at least 35 years of age had developed premature coronary artery disease. One of four mutants of Apo-AI is present in roughly 0.3% of the Japanese population, but is found in 6% of those with low HDL cholesterol levels.

ApoA-I Milano is a naturally occurring mutant of Apo-AI, found in a few families in Limone sul Garda, Italy, and, by genetic and church record family tree detective work, traced to a single individual, Giovanni Pomarelli, in the 18th century. Described in 1980, it was the first known molecular abnormality of apolipoproteins. Paradoxically, carriers of this mutation have very low HDL-C (HDL-cholesterol) levels, but no increase in the risk of heart disease, often living to age 100 or older. This unusual observation was what lead Italian investigators to track down what was going on and lead to the discovery of apoA-I Milano (the city, Milano, ~160 km away, in which the researcher's lab was located). Biochemically, apo A1 contains an extra cysteine bridge, causing it to exist as a homodimer or as a heterodimer with Apo-AII. However, the enhanced cardioprotective activity of this mutant (which likely depends on fat & cholesterol efflux) cannot easily be replicated by other cysteine mutants.

Recombinant Apo-AI Milano dimers formulated into liposomes can reduce atheromas in animal models by up to 30%. Apo-AI Milano has also been shown in small clinical trials to have a statistically significant effect in reducing (reversing) plaque build-up on arterial walls.

In human trials the reversal of plaque build-up was measured over the course of five weeks.

=== Novel haplotypes within apolipoprotein AI-CIII-AIV gene cluster ===
A study from 2008 describes two novel susceptibility haplotypes, P2-S2-X1 and P1-S2-X1, discovered in ApoAI-CIII-AIV gene cluster on chromosome 11q23, which confer approximately threefold higher risk of coronary heart disease in normal as well as in the patients having type 2 diabetes mellitus.

=== Role in other diseases ===
A G/A polymorphism in the promoter of the APOA1 gene has been associated with the age at which Alzheimer's disease is presented. Protection from Alzheimer's disease by Apo-AI may rely on a synergistic interaction with alpha-tocopherol. Amyloid deposited in the knee following surgery consists largely of Apo-AI secreted from chondrocytes (cartilage cells). A wide variety of amyloidosis symptoms are associated with rare APOA1 mutants.

Apo-AI binds to lipopolysaccharide or endotoxin, and has a major role in the anti-endotoxin function of HDL.

In one study, a decrease in Apo-AI levels was detected in schizophrenia patients' CSF, brain and peripheral tissues.

=== Epistatic impact of Apo-AI ===
Apolipoprotein AI and ApoE interact epistatically to modulate triglyceride levels in coronary heart disease patients. Individually, neither Apo-AI nor ApoE was found to be associated with triglyceride (TG) levels, but pairwise epistasis (additive x additive model) explored their significant synergistic contributions with raised TG levels (P<0.01).

=== Factors affecting Apo-AI activity ===
In a study from 2005 it was reported, that Apo-AI production is decreased by calcitriol. It was concluded, that this regulation happens on transcription level: calcitriol alters yet unknown coactivators or corepressors, resulting in repression of APOA1 promoter activity. Simultaneously, Apo-AI production was increased by vitamin D antagonist, ZK-191784.

Exercise or statin treatment may cause an increase in HDL-C levels by inducing Apo-AI production, but this depends on the G/A promoter polymorphism.

== Interactions ==
Apolipoprotein A1 has been shown to interact with:

- ABCA1
- GPLD1
- PLTP

=== Potential binding partners ===
Apolipoprotein AI binding precursor, a relative of APOA-1 abbreviated APOA1BP, has a predicted biochemical interaction with carbohydrate kinase domain containing protein. The relationship between these two proteins is substantiated by cooccurance across genomes and coexpression. The ortholog of CARKD in E. coli contains a domain not present in any eukaryotic ortholog. This domain has a high sequence identity to APOA1BP. CARKD is a protein of unknown function, and the biochemical basis for this interaction is unknown.

=== Interactive pathway map ===
Click on genes, proteins and metabolites below to link to respective articles. (Note: The interactive pathway map can be edited at WikiPathways: "Statin_Pathway_WP430".)

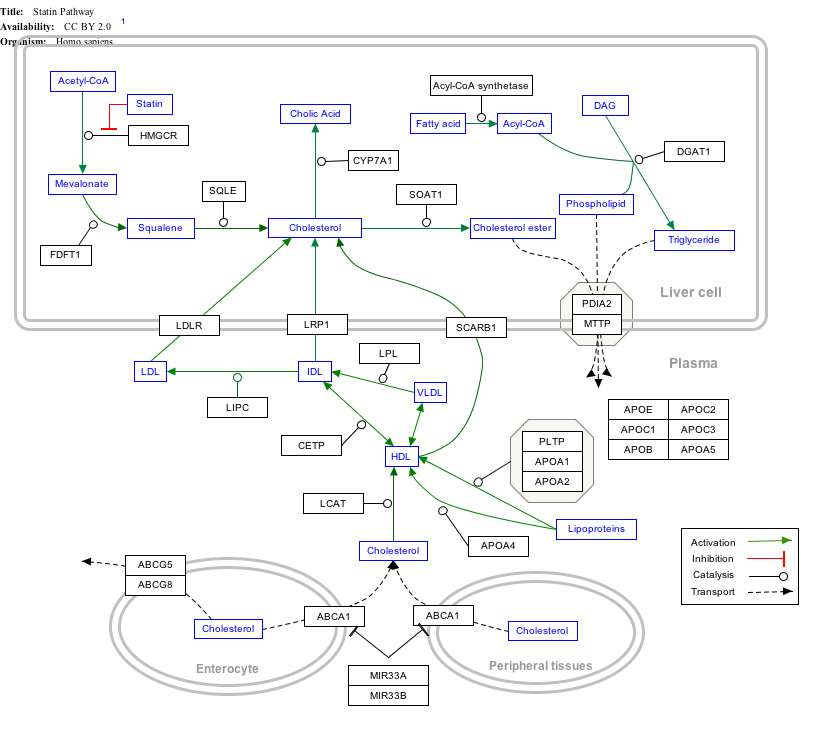

Statin pathway edit

== See also ==
- Apolipoprotein B
- Cardiovascular disease
- ApoA-1 Milano
