= Lecithin cholesterol acyltransferase deficiency =

Disorder of lipoprotein metabolism

- Other names: LCAT deficiency
- Specialty: Medical genetics

Lecithin cholesterol acyltransferase deficiency is a disorder of lipoprotein metabolism. The disease has two forms: Familial LCAT deficiency, in which there is complete LCAT deficiency, and Fish-eye disease, in which there is a partial deficiency.

Lecithin cholesterol acyltransferase catalyzes the formation of cholesterol esters in lipoproteins.

== Signs and symptoms ==
Symptoms of the familial form include visual impairment caused by diffuse corneal opacities, target cell hemolytic anemia, and kidney failure. Less common symptoms include atherosclerosis, hepatomegaly (enlarged liver), splenomegaly (enlarged spleen), and enlarged lymph nodes. Fish-eye disease is less severe and most commonly presents with impaired vision due to corneal opacification. It rarely presents with other findings, although, atherosclerosis, hepatomegaly, splenomegaly, and lymphadenopathy can occur. Carlson and Philipson found that the disease was named so because the cornea of the eye was so opaque or cloudy with dots of cholesterol that it resembled a boiled fish. If an individual only carries one copy of the mutated gene, they typically do not show symptoms.

== Pathophysiology ==
A deficiency of LCAT causes accumulation of unesterified cholesterol in certain body tissues. Cholesterol effluxes from cells as free cholesterol and is transported in HDL as esterified cholesterol. LCAT is the enzyme that esterifies the free cholesterol on HDL to cholesterol ester and allows the maturation of HDL. LCAT deficiency does not allow for HDL maturation resulting in its rapid catabolism of circulating apolipoprotein A1 and apolipoprotein A2. The remaining form of HDL resembles nascent HDL.

The LCAT glycoprotein produces lysophosphatidylcholine and cholesterol ester and binds to lipoproteins after being secreted by the liver. Usually the enzyme produced is responsible for cholesterol ester formation and high density lipoprotein (HDL) metabolism, but in fish-eye disease the enzyme cannot esterify, or make the acid into an alkyl, cholesterol in HDL particles. However, there is only a partial deficiency because the enzyme remains active on the cholesterol particles in very low density lipoproteins (VLDL) and low density lipoproteins (LDL). The opaqueness of the eye is caused by the deposit of lipids onto the cornea.

== Diagnosis ==
Definitive diagnosis requires LCAT gene analysis for mutation and functional activity. However, numerous lab tests may help with making a diagnosis such as complete blood count (CBC), urinalysis, blood chemistries, lipid panels, and plasma LCAT activity. Fish-eye disease is characterized by abnormalities like visual impairment, plaques of fatty material, and dense opacification.

=== Types ===
Both the familial type and Fish-eye disease are autosomal recessive disorders caused by mutations of the LCAT gene located on chromosome 16q22.1, which is the long (q) arm of chromosome 16 a position 22.1. Both diseases are very rare with ~70 reported cases of familial LCAT deficiency and ~30 cases of fish-eye disease.

=== Familial LCAT Deficiency Lab Findings ===
- CBC: normochromic normocytic anemia
- Urinalysis: proteinuria in young adults (suggestive of kidney failure)
- Blood Chemistries: elevated blood urea nitrogen (BUN) and creatinine (suggestive of kidney failure)
- Lipid Panel: low high-density lipoprotein (HDL) < 10 mg/dL, elevated very low-density lipoprotein (VLDL) and triglycerides, high plasma unesterified cholesterol, and low plasma cholesterol ester
- Plasma LCAT activity: decreased (determined by decreased ability to esterify radioactive cholesterol in exogenous lipoproteins)

=== Fish-eye Disease Lab Findings ===
- CBC: no anemia
- Urinalysis: no protein in the urine
- Blood Chemistries: normal blood urea nitrogen (BUN) and creatinine (no signs of kidney failure)
- Lipid Panel: low high-density lipoprotein (HDL) < 10 mg/dL, elevated very low-density lipoprotein (VLDL) and triglycerides, high plasma unesterified cholesterol in HDL particles, and low cholesterol ester in HDL particles but normal levels in low-density lipoprotein (LDL) and VLDL particles
- Plasma LCAT activity: decreased only in HDL particles but not LDL

=== Genetic Findings in Fish-eye Disease ===
Mutations in the LCAT gene, which is localized in the q21–22 region of chromosome 16, cause fish-eye disease. The mutation in the LCAT gene is homozygous for a Thr123→Ile mutation or Pro10→Leu mutation. New mutations have been identified as homozygosity for an A2205→G nucleotide substitution in exon 4 of the LCAT gene which is predicted to be the cause of an Asp131→Asn substitution.

== Treatment ==
Currently, there is no specific treatment to correct the LCAT deficiency so therapy is focused on symptom relief. Corneal transplant may be considered for patients presenting with severely impaired vision caused by cholesterol corneal opacities. Dialysis may be required for patients presenting with kidney failure, and kidney transplant may be considered.

== Prognosis ==
Kidney failure is the major cause of morbidity and mortality in complete LCAT deficiency, while in partial deficiency (fish eye disease) major cause of morbidity is visual impairment due to corneal opacity. These patients have low HDL cholesterol but surprisingly premature atherosclerosis is not seen. However, there are some reported cases.
