= NAD(P)H-hydrate epimerase =

Enzyme found in humans

NAXE

Identifiers
- Aliases: NAXE, AIBP, YJEFN1, APOA1BP, NAD(P)HX epimerase, PEBEL
- External IDs: OMIM: 608862; MGI: 2180167; GeneCards: NAXE
Enzyme activity
EC #	BRENDA	ExPASy	KEGG	MetaCyc
5.1.99.6	↗	↗	↗	↗

Gene location (Human)
Chr.	Chromosome 1 (human)
Band	1q22	Start	156,591,756 bp
Band	1q22	End	156,609,507 bp

Gene location (Mouse)
Chr.	Chromosome 3 (mouse)
Band	3|3 F1	Start	87,963,827 bp
Band	3|3 F1	End	87,965,802 bp
RNA expression pattern
Bgee	Human / Mouse (ortholog); Top expressed in: apex of heart; cardiac muscle tissue of right atrium; myocardium of left ventricle; islet of Langerhans; mucosa of transverse colon; prefrontal cortex; right auricle of heart; corpus epididymis; anterior pituitary; human kidney / Top expressed in: choroid plexus of fourth ventricle; facial motor nucleus; right kidney; utricle; right lung lobe; Ileal epithelium; proximal tubule; vestibular sensory epithelium; external carotid artery; transitional epithelium of urinary bladder; More reference expression data
BioGPS	n/a
Gene ontology
Molecular function	nucleotide binding; NADHX epimerase activity; protein binding; protein homodimerization activity; isomerase activity; metal ion binding; NADPHX epimerase activity
Cellular component	cell body; extracellular region; cilium; extracellular exosome; intracellular membrane-bounded organelle; mitochondrion; nucleus; nucleoplasm; mitochondrial matrix; extracellular space; cytosol
Biological process	protein homotetramerization; NAD biosynthesis via nicotinamide riboside salvage pathway; nicotinamide nucleotide metabolic process; NADH metabolic process; NADP metabolic process
Sources:Amigo / QuickGO
Orthologs
Databases	NCBI: entry; OMA: entry
Species	Human	Mouse
Entrez	128240	246703
Ensembl	ENSG00000163382	ENSMUSG00000028070
UniProt	Q8NCW5	Q8K4Z3
RefSeq (mRNA)	NM_144772	NM_144897
RefSeq (protein)	NP_658985	NP_659146
Location (UCSC)	Chr 1: 156.59 – 156.61 Mb	Chr 3: 87.96 – 87.97 Mb
PubMed search
- Wikidata
View/Edit Human	View/Edit Mouse

NAD(P)H-hydrate epimerase is an enzyme that in humans is encoded by the NAXE gene (previously APOA1BP).

Mutations in NAXE gene are associated with progressive encephalopathy with brain edema and/or leukoencephalopathy-1 (PEBEL-1), a rare, lethal, neurometabolic disorder.

== Structure ==
NAXE gene is located on chromosome 1, with its specific location being 1q22. The gene contains 6 exons, 5 introns, and spans 2.5 kb. Expression is ubiquitous across all human tissues, with highest observed in kidney, heart, liver, testis, thyroid gland, adrenal gland. NAXE contains Yje_FN domain.

== Function ==
NAXE binds to APOA1, APOA2, and high-density lipoprotein (HDL). In addition, APOA1BP appears to play a role in sperm capacitation. It has been demonstrated that APOA1BP is involved in angiogenesis regulation, by accelerating cholesterol efflux from endothelial cells to HDL. It is known that zebrafish NAXE ortholog Aibp is involved in angiogenesis regulation. The protein was also shown to be involved in atherosclerosis protection.

== Enzyme class ==
NAD(P)H-hydrate epimerase

Identifiers
- EC no.: 5.1.99.6

Databases
- BRENDA: enzyme data
- ExPASy: NiceZyme view
- KEGG: enzyme entry
- MetaCyc: metabolic pathway
- Rhea: reactions
- PDB structures: RCSB PDB PDBe PDBsum
Search
- PMC: articles
- PubMed: articles
- NCBI: proteins

More generally, an NAD(P)H-hydrate epimerase (EC 5.1.99.6, NAD(P)HX epimerase) is a type of enzyme with systematic name (6R)-6beta-hydroxy-1,4,5,6-tetrahydronicotinamide-adenine dinucleotide 6-epimerase. Enzymes of this class, especially NAXE and its orthologs, catalyse the following chemical reaction

(1) (6R)-6beta-hydroxy-1,4,5,6-tetrahydronicotinamide-adenine dinucleotide $\rightleftharpoons$ (6S)-6beta-hydroxy-1,4,5,6-tetrahydronicotinamide-adenine dinucleotide
(2) (6R)-6beta-hydroxy-1,4,5,6-tetrahydronicotinamide-adenine dinucleotide phosphate $\rightleftharpoons$ (6S)-6beta-hydroxy-1,4,5,6-tetrahydronicotinamide-adenine dinucleotide phosphate

The enzyme can use either (R)-NADH-hydrate or (R)-NADPH-hydrate as a substrate.
