= ABCA1 =

Mammalian protein found in Homo sapiens

Identifiers
- Aliases: ABCA1, ATP-binding cassette, sub-family A (ABC1), member 1, Abca1, ABC-1, Abc1, ABC1, CERP, HDLDT1, TGD, ATP binding cassette subfamily A member 1, HDLCQTL13, HPALP1
- External IDs: OMIM: 600046; MGI: 99607; GeneCards: ABCA1
Enzyme activity
EC #	BRENDA	ExPASy	KEGG	MetaCyc
7.6.2.1	↗	↗	↗	↗

Gene location (Human)
Chr.	Chromosome 9 (human)
Band	9q31.1	Start	104,781,006 bp
Band	9q31.1	End	104,928,155 bp

Gene location (Mouse)
Chr.	Chromosome 4 (mouse)
Band	4 B2|4 28.57 cM	Start	53,030,787 bp
Band	4 B2|4 28.57 cM	End	53,159,895 bp
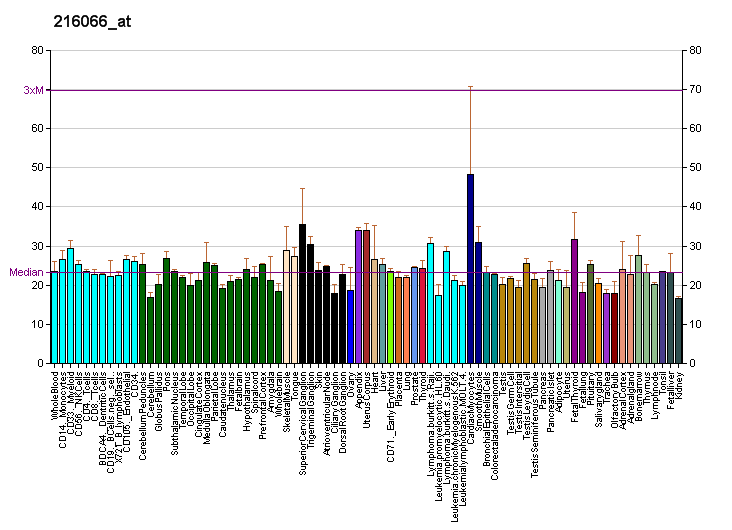

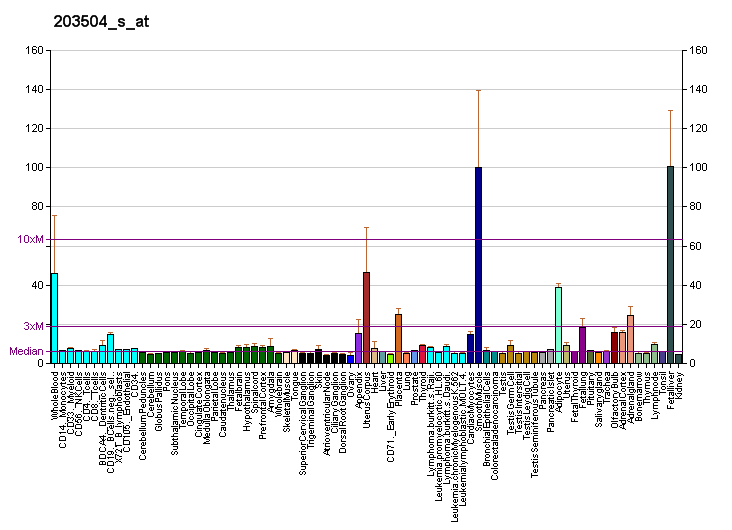
RNA expression pattern
Bgee	Human / Mouse (ortholog); Top expressed in: skin of hip; left adrenal gland; left adrenal cortex; right adrenal gland; skin of thigh; right adrenal cortex; epithelium of colon; stromal cell of endometrium; lower lobe of lung; liver / Top expressed in: stroma of bone marrow; subcutaneous adipose tissue; skin of external ear; left lung lobe; endothelial cell of lymphatic vessel; transitional epithelium of urinary bladder; gastrula; decidua; left lobe of liver; ciliary body; More reference expression data
BioGPS	More reference expression data
Gene ontology
Molecular function	ATPase-coupled transmembrane transporter activity; apolipoprotein binding; nucleotide binding; ATPase binding; apolipoprotein A-I receptor activity; anion transmembrane transporter activity; phospholipid transporter activity; cholesterol binding; small GTPase binding; protein binding; syntaxin binding; signaling receptor binding; phospholipid binding; ATP binding; cholesterol transfer activity; phosphatidylserine floppase activity; ATPase activity; phosphatidylcholine floppase activity; apolipoprotein A-I binding; high-density lipoprotein particle binding; lipid transporter activity
Cellular component	integral component of membrane; Golgi apparatus; membrane; plasma membrane; endocytic vesicle; integral component of plasma membrane; cell surface; phagocytic vesicle; high-density lipoprotein particle; perinuclear region of cytoplasm; membrane raft; external side of plasma membrane; endoplasmic reticulum membrane; intracellular membrane-bounded organelle; endosome
Biological process	G protein-coupled receptor signaling pathway; cellular response to retinoic acid; phospholipid homeostasis; steroid metabolic process; platelet dense granule organization; regulation of Cdc42 protein signal transduction; response to nutrient; lipid metabolism; phospholipid efflux; phospholipid transport; cholesterol transport; response to laminar fluid shear stress; peptide secretion; cholesterol metabolic process; cellular response to cholesterol; negative regulation of cholesterol storage; endosomal transport; phagocytosis, engulfment; anion transmembrane transport; intracellular cholesterol transport; cholesterol efflux; protein lipidation; lipoprotein biosynthetic process; lysosome organization; cellular response to lipopolysaccharide; negative regulation of macrophage derived foam cell differentiation; reverse cholesterol transport; apolipoprotein A-I-mediated signaling pathway; positive regulation of cholesterol efflux; phospholipid translocation; regulation of high-density lipoprotein particle assembly; transmembrane transport; cholesterol homeostasis; regulation of lipid metabolic process; high-density lipoprotein particle assembly; lipoprotein metabolic process; adenylate cyclase-activating G protein-coupled receptor signaling pathway; cellular response to low-density lipoprotein particle stimulus; lipid transport; positive regulation of high-density lipoprotein particle assembly
Sources:Amigo / QuickGO
Orthologs
Databases	NCBI: entry; OMA: entry
Species	Human	Mouse
Entrez	19	11303
Ensembl	ENSG00000165029	ENSMUSG00000015243
UniProt	O95477	P41233
RefSeq (mRNA)	NM_005502	NM_013454
RefSeq (protein)	NP_005493	NP_038482
Location (UCSC)	Chr 9: 104.78 – 104.93 Mb	Chr 4: 53.03 – 53.16 Mb
PubMed search
- Wikidata
View/Edit Human	View/Edit Mouse

ATP-binding cassette transporter ABCA1 (member 1 of human transporter sub-family ABCA), also known as the cholesterol efflux regulatory protein (CERP) is a protein which in humans is encoded by the ABCA1 gene. This transporter is a major regulator of cellular cholesterol and phospholipid homeostasis.

== Tangier disease ==
It was discovered that a mutation in the ABCA1 protein is responsible for causing Tangier disease by several groups in 1998. Gerd Schmitz's group in Germany and Michael Hayden's group in British Columbia were using standard genetics techniques and DNA from family pedigrees to locate the mutation. Richard Lawn's group at CV Therapeutics in Palo Alto, CA used cDNA microarrays, which were relatively new at the time, to assess gene expression profiles from cell lines created from normal and affected individuals. They showed cell lines from patients with Tangier's disease showed differential regulation of the ABCA1 gene. Subsequent sequencing of the gene identified the mutations. This group received an award from the American Heart Association for their discovery. Tangier disease has been identified in nearly 100 patients worldwide, and patients have a broad range of biochemical and clinical phenotypes as over 100 different mutations have been identified in ABCA1 resulting in the disease.

== Function ==
The membrane-associated protein encoded by this gene is a member of the superfamily of ATP-binding cassette (ABC) transporters. ABC proteins transport various molecules across extra- and intracellular membranes. ABC genes are divided into seven distinct subfamilies (ABCA, MDR/TAP, MRP, ALD, OABP, GCN20, White). This protein is a member of the ABCA subfamily. Members of the ABCA subfamily comprise the only major ABC subfamily found exclusively in multicellular eukaryotes. With cholesterol as its substrate, this protein functions as a cholesterol efflux pump in the cellular lipid removal pathway.

While the complete 3D-structure of ABCA1 remains relatively unknown, there has been some determination of the c-terminus. The ABCA1 c-terminus contains a PDZ domain, responsible for mediating protein-protein interactions, as well as a VFVNFA motif essential for lipid efflux activity.

== Physiological role ==
ABCA1 mediates the efflux of cholesterol and phospholipids to lipid-poor apolipoproteins (apoA1 and apoE) (reverse cholesterol transport), which then form nascent high-density lipoproteins (HDL). It also mediates the transport of lipids between Golgi and cell membrane. Since this protein is needed throughout the body it is expressed ubiquitously as a 220 kDa protein. It is present in higher quantities in tissues that shuttle or are involved in the turnover of lipids such as the liver, the small intestine and adipose tissue.

Factors that act upon the ABCA1 transporter's expression or its posttranslational modification are also molecules that are involved in its subsequent function like fatty acids, cholesterol and also cytokines and cAMP. Adiponectin induces reverse cholesterol transport by an ABCA1-dependent pathway. Other endogenous metabolites more loosely related to the ABCA1 functions are also reported to influence the expression of this transporter, including glucose and bilirubin.

Interactions between members of the apoliprotein family and ABCA1 activate multiple signalling pathways, including the JAK-STAT, PKA, and PKC pathways

Overexpression of ABCA1 has been reported to induce resistance to the anti-inflammatory diarylheptanoid antioxidant curcumin. Downregulation of ABCA1 in senescent macrophages disrupts the cell's ability to remove cholesterol from its cytoplasm, leading the cells to promote pathologic atherogenesis (blood vessel thickening/hardening) which "plays a central role in common age-associated diseases such as atherosclerosis, cancer, and macular degeneration" Knockout mouse models of AMD treated with agonists that increase ABCA1 in loss of function and gain of function experiments demonstrated the protective role of elevating ABCA1 in regulating angiogenesis in eye disease. Human data from patients and controls were used to demonstrate the translation of mouse findings in human disease.

== Clinical significance ==
Mutations in this gene have been associated with Tangier disease and familial high-density lipoprotein deficiency. ABCA1 has been shown to be reduced in Tangier disease which features physiological deficiencies of HDL. Leukocytes' ABCA1 gene expression is upregulated in postmenopausal women receiving hormone replacement therapy (HRT). ABCA1 expression is also upregulated in tumor-associated astroctytes surrounding glioblastoma brain tumors, and is important to the tumor progression.

== Interactive pathway map ==
Click on genes, proteins and metabolites below to link to respective articles. (Note: The interactive pathway map can be edited at WikiPathways: "Statin_Pathway_WP430".)

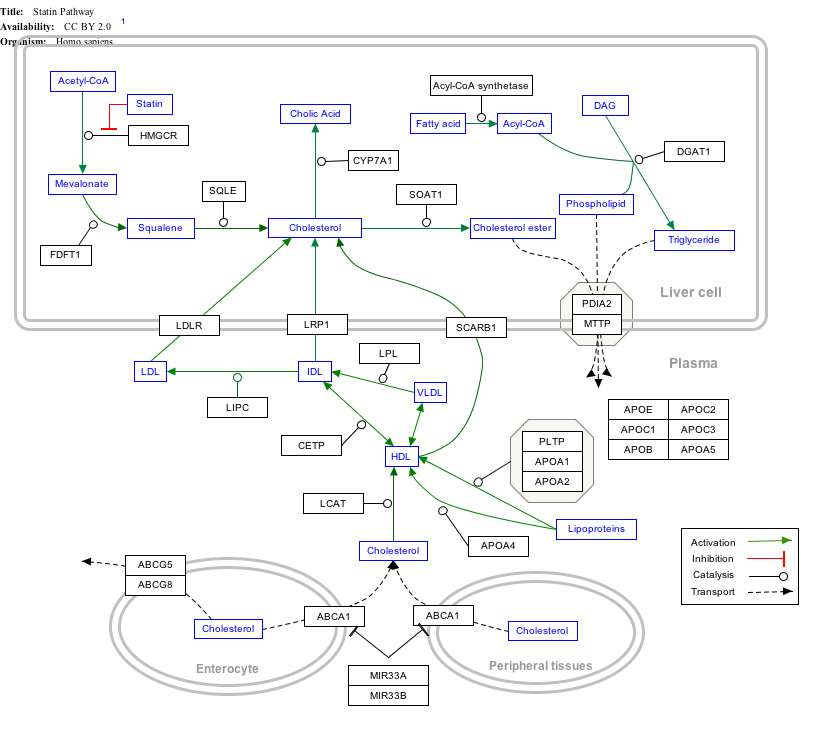

Statin pathway edit

== Interactions ==
ABCA1 has been shown to interact with:

- APOA1,
- APOE,
- FADD,
- SNTB2, and
- XPC.

== See also ==
- ATP-binding cassette transporter
