= Lecithin–cholesterol acyltransferase =

Mammalian protein found in Homo sapiens

LCAT
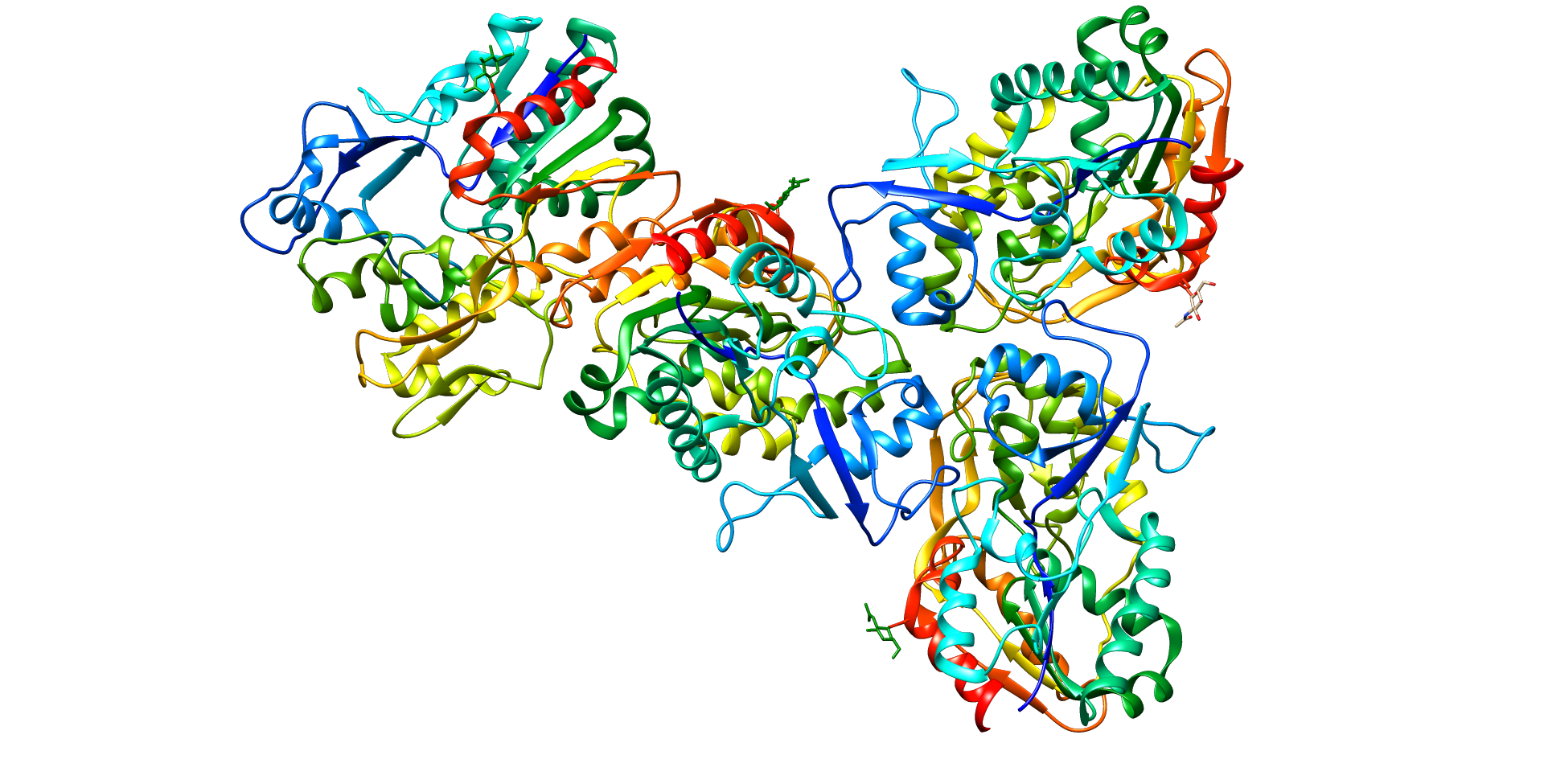
Available structures
PDB	Ortholog search: PDBe RCSB
PDB	List of PDB id codes 4X96, 4XWG, 4XX1, 5BV7

Identifiers
- Aliases: LCAT, entrez:3931, lecithin-cholesterol acyltransferase
- External IDs: OMIM: 606967; MGI: 96755; HomoloGene: 68042; GeneCards: LCAT; OMA:LCAT - orthologs

Gene location (Human)
Chr.	Chromosome 16 (human)
Band	16q22.1	Start	67,939,750 bp
Band	16q22.1	End	67,944,131 bp

Gene location (Mouse)
Chr.	Chromosome 8 (mouse)
Band	8 D3|8 53.06 cM	Start	106,666,183 bp
Band	8 D3|8 53.06 cM	End	106,670,014 bp
RNA expression pattern
Bgee	Human / Mouse (ortholog); Top expressed in: right lobe of liver; right hemisphere of cerebellum; tibial nerve; left lobe of thyroid gland; apex of heart; right lobe of thyroid gland; ascending aorta; right coronary artery; canal of the cervix; body of uterus / Top expressed in: left lobe of liver; lumbar subsegment of spinal cord; dentate gyrus of hippocampal formation granule cell; cerebellar cortex; yolk sac; primary visual cortex; CA3 field; optic nerve; hippocampus proper; superior frontal gyrus; More reference expression data
BioGPS	n/a
Gene ontology
Molecular function	transferase activity; O-acyltransferase activity; apolipoprotein A-I binding; protein binding; acyltransferase activity; phosphatidylcholine-sterol O-acyltransferase activity
Cellular component	extracellular region; high-density lipoprotein particle; extracellular exosome; extracellular space
Biological process	steroid metabolic process; regulation of high-density lipoprotein particle assembly; lipid metabolism; cholesterol transport; cholesterol metabolic process; cholesterol esterification; very-low-density lipoprotein particle remodeling; phospholipid metabolic process; lipoprotein biosynthetic process; cholesterol homeostasis; phosphatidylcholine biosynthetic process; phosphatidylcholine metabolic process; reverse cholesterol transport; high-density lipoprotein particle remodeling
Sources:Amigo / QuickGO
Orthologs
Species	Human	Mouse
Entrez	3931	16816
Ensembl	ENSG00000213398	ENSMUSG00000035237
UniProt	P04180	P16301
RefSeq (mRNA)	NM_000229	NM_008490
RefSeq (protein)	NP_000220	NP_032516
Location (UCSC)	Chr 16: 67.94 – 67.94 Mb	Chr 8: 106.67 – 106.67 Mb
PubMed search
- Wikidata
View/Edit Human	View/Edit Mouse

Lecithin–cholesterol acyltransferase (LCAT, also called phosphatidylcholine–sterol O-acyltransferase) is an enzyme found in many animals, including humans. It converts free cholesterol into cholesteryl ester, a more hydrophobic form of cholesterol. This process sequesters cholesterol ester into the core of a lipoprotein particle, eventually making the newly synthesized HDL spherical and forcing the reaction to become unidirectional since the particles are removed from the surface. The enzyme is bound to high-density lipoproteins (HDLs) (alpha-LCAT) and LDLs (beta-LCAT) in the blood plasma. LCAT deficiency can cause impaired vision due to cholesterol corneal opacities, anemia, and kidney damage. It belongs to the family of phospholipid:diacylglycerol acyltransferases.

== Interactive pathway map ==
Click on genes, proteins and metabolites below to link to respective articles. (Note: The interactive pathway map can be edited at WikiPathways: "Statin_Pathway_WP430".)

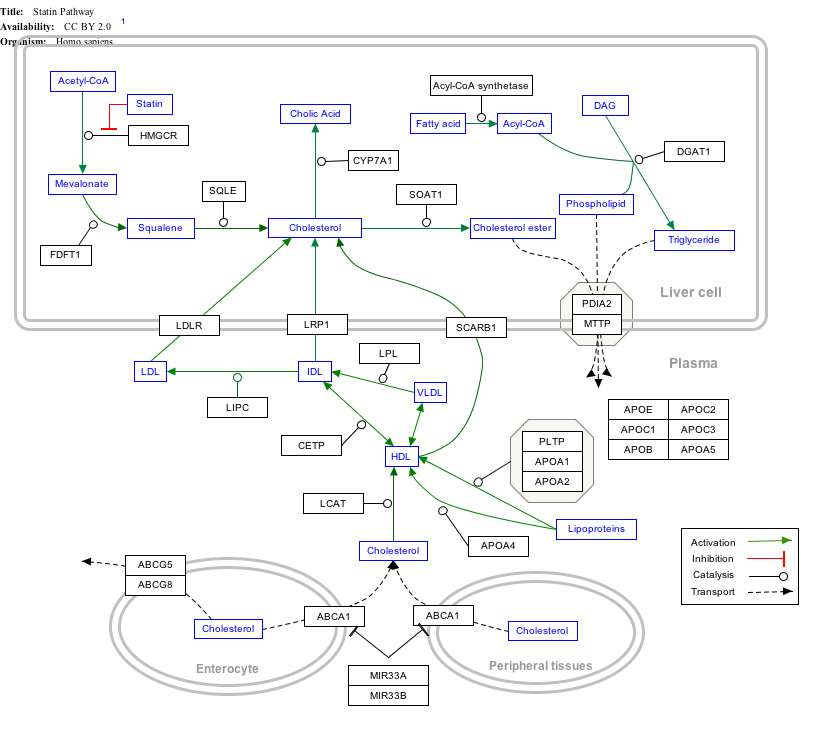

Statin pathway edit

== See also ==
- Lecithin cholesterol acyltransferase deficiency
- Acyl-CoA:cholesterol acyltransferase (ACAT)
