= Limone sul Garda =

Limone sul Garda Limù
- Comune
- Comune di Limone sul Garda
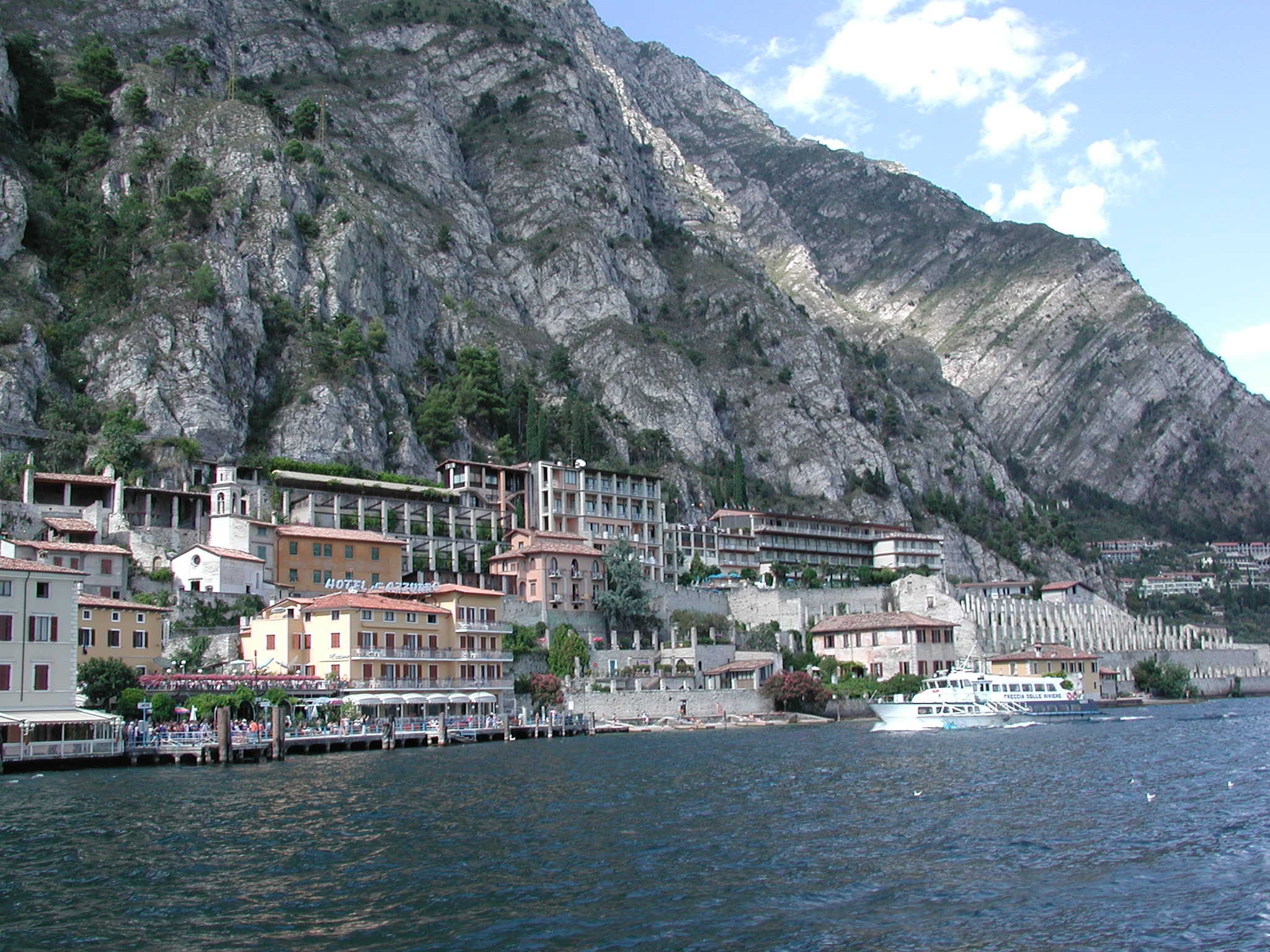

- Coat of arms

- Location within Italy Location within Lombardy
- Coordinates: 45°48′30″N 10°47′15″E
- Country: Italy
- Region: Lombardy
- Province: Brescia (BS)

Government
  - Mayor: Franceschino Risatti

Area
  - Total: 26 km^{2} (10 sq mi)
- Elevation: 69 m (226 ft)

Population (2011)
  - Total: 1,177
  - Density: 45/km^{2} (120/sq mi)
- Demonym: Limonesi
- Time zone: UTC+1 (CET)
  - Summer (DST): UTC+2 (CEST)
- Postal code: 25010
- Dialing code: 0365
- Saint day: July 10
- Website: Official website

Limone sul Garda (Gardesano: Limù) is a town and comune in the province of Brescia, in Lombardy (northern Italy), at the western bank of Lake Garda.

== History ==
Despite the presence of famous cultivations of lemons (the meaning of limone in Italian), the town's name is probably derived from the ancient lemos (elm) or limes (Latin: boundary, referring to the communes of Brescia and the Bishopric of Trento). Between 1863 and 1905 the denomination of the comune was Limone San Giovanni.

On 13 September 1786, the famous German poet J. Wolfgang Goethe passed by the village by boat and described with these words its lemon gardens:

"We passed Limone, the mountain-gardens of which, laid out terrace-fashion, and planted with citron-trees, have a neat and rich appearance. The whole garden consists of rows of square white pillars placed at some distance from each other, and rising up the mountain in steps. On these pillars strong beams are laid, that the trees planted between them may be sheltered in the winter. The view of these pleasant objects was favored by a slow passage, and we had already passed Malcesine when the wind suddenly changed, took the direction usual in the day-time, and blew towards the north."

(Italian Journey, J. Wolfgang Goethe, 1816–17)

Until the 1940s, the town was reachable only by lake or through the mountains, with the road to Riva del Garda being completed in 1932, but today Limone is one of the most renowned tourist resorts in the area.

== Municipal government ==
Limone is headed by a mayor (sindaco) assisted by a legislative body, the consiglio comunale, and an executive body, the giunta comunale. Since 1995 the mayor and members of the consiglio comunale are directly elected together by resident citizens, while from 1945 to 1995 the mayor was chosen by the legislative body. The giunta comunale is chaired by the mayor, who appoints others members, called assessori. The offices of the comune are housed in a building usually called the municipio or palazzo comunale.

Since 1995, the mayor of Limone is directly elected by citizens, originally every four, then every five years. The current mayor is Franceschini Risatti, elected for a fourth term on 10 June 2024.

Mayor	Term start	Term end	Party
Giovanni Battista Martinelli	24 April 1995	14 June 2004	Ind
Franceschino Risatti	14 June 2004	27 May 2019	Ind
Antonio Martinelli	27 May 2019	10 June 2024	Ind
Franceschino Risatti	10 June 2024	Incumbent	Ind

== Health ==
In 1979, researchers discovered that people in Limone possess a mutant form of apolipoprotein (called ApoA-1 Milano) in their blood, that induced a healthy form of high-density cholesterol, which resulted in a lowered risk of atherosclerosis and other cardiovascular diseases.

The protein appears to have given residents of the village extreme longevity - a dozen of those living here are over the age of 100 (for c. 1,000 total inhabitants). The origin of the mutation has been traced back to a couple who lived in Limone in the 17th century. Research has been ongoing to develop pharmaceutical treatments against heart disease based on mimicking the beneficial effects of the ApoA-1 mutation.

== Gallery ==
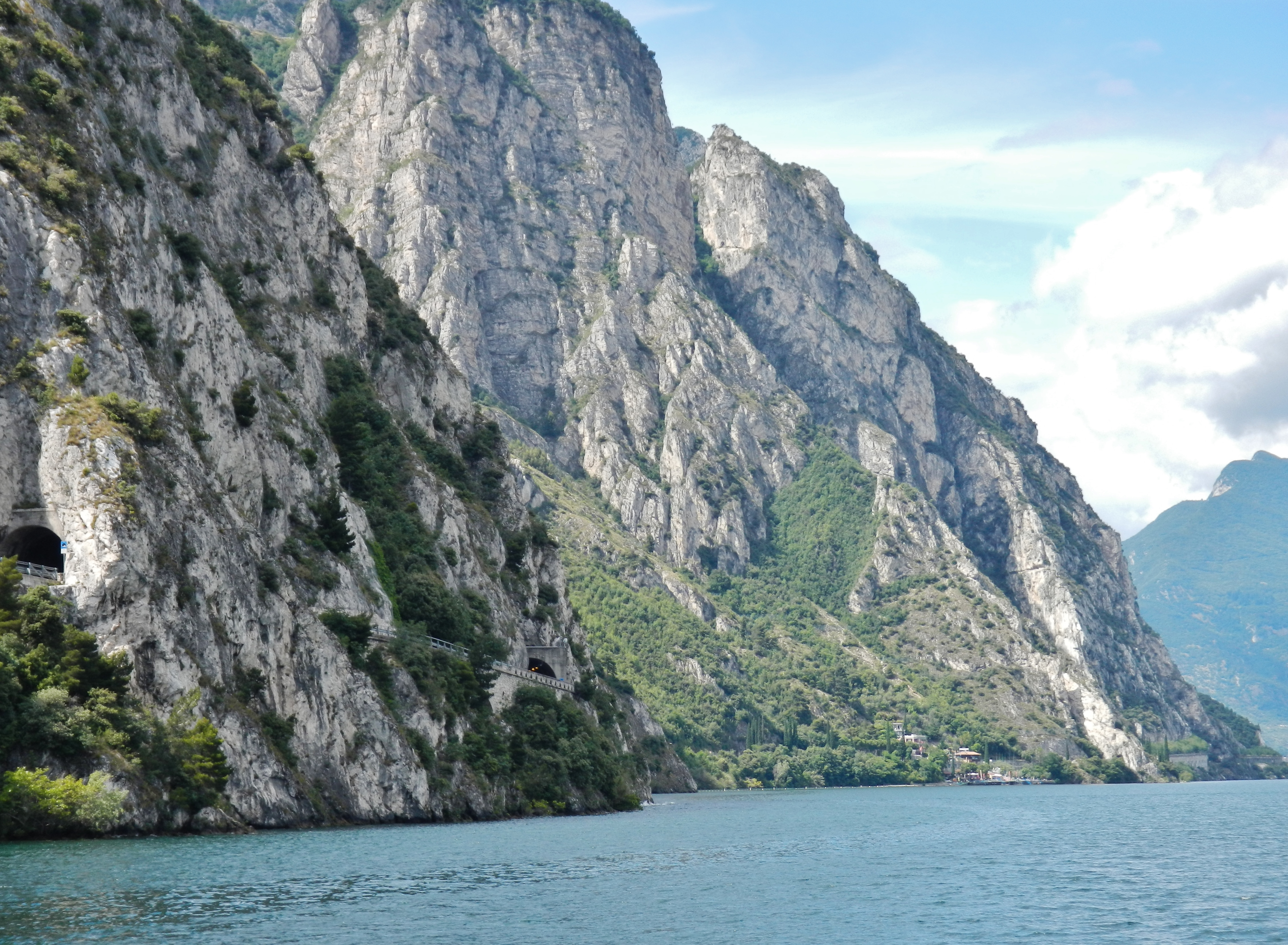

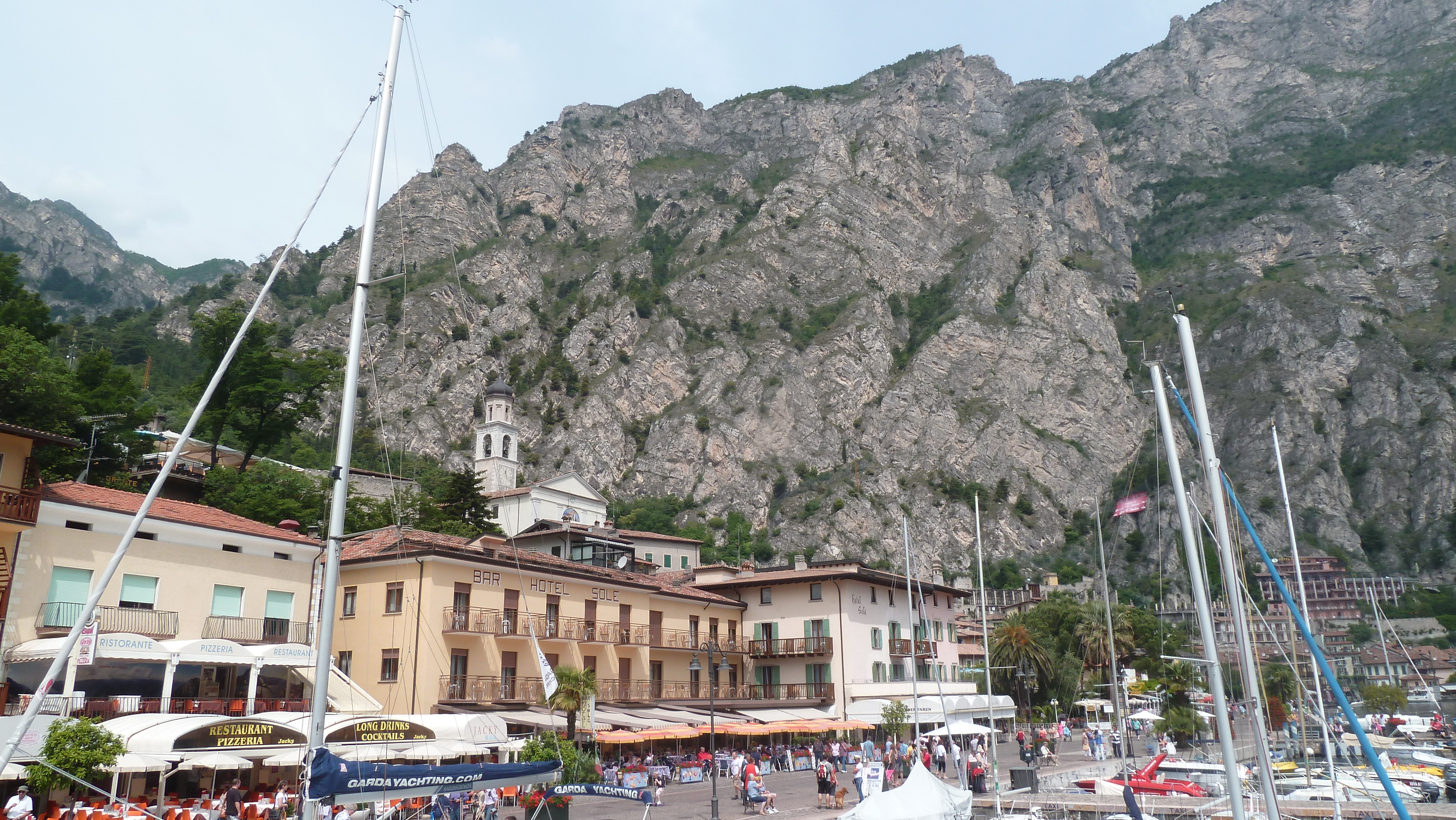

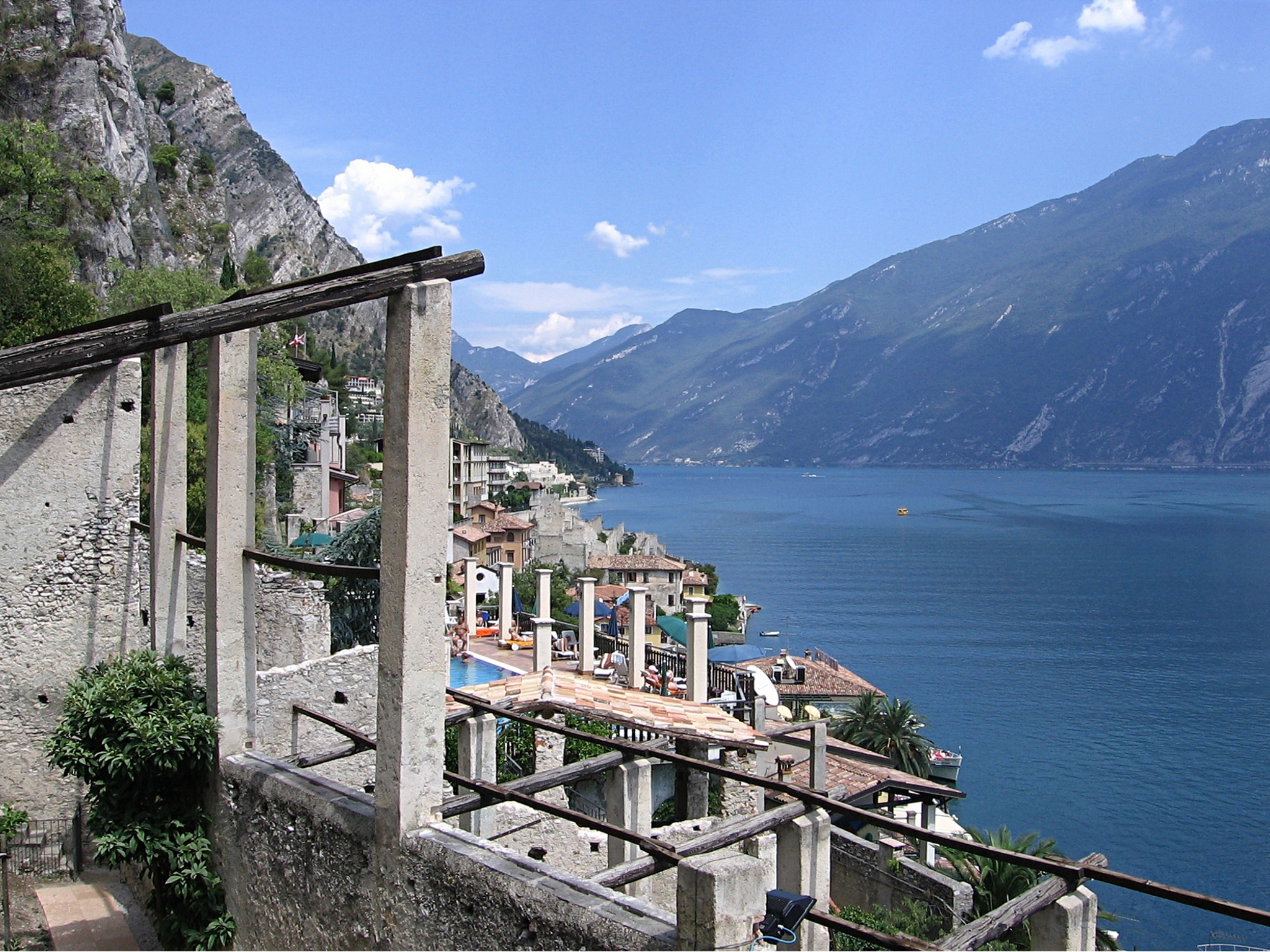

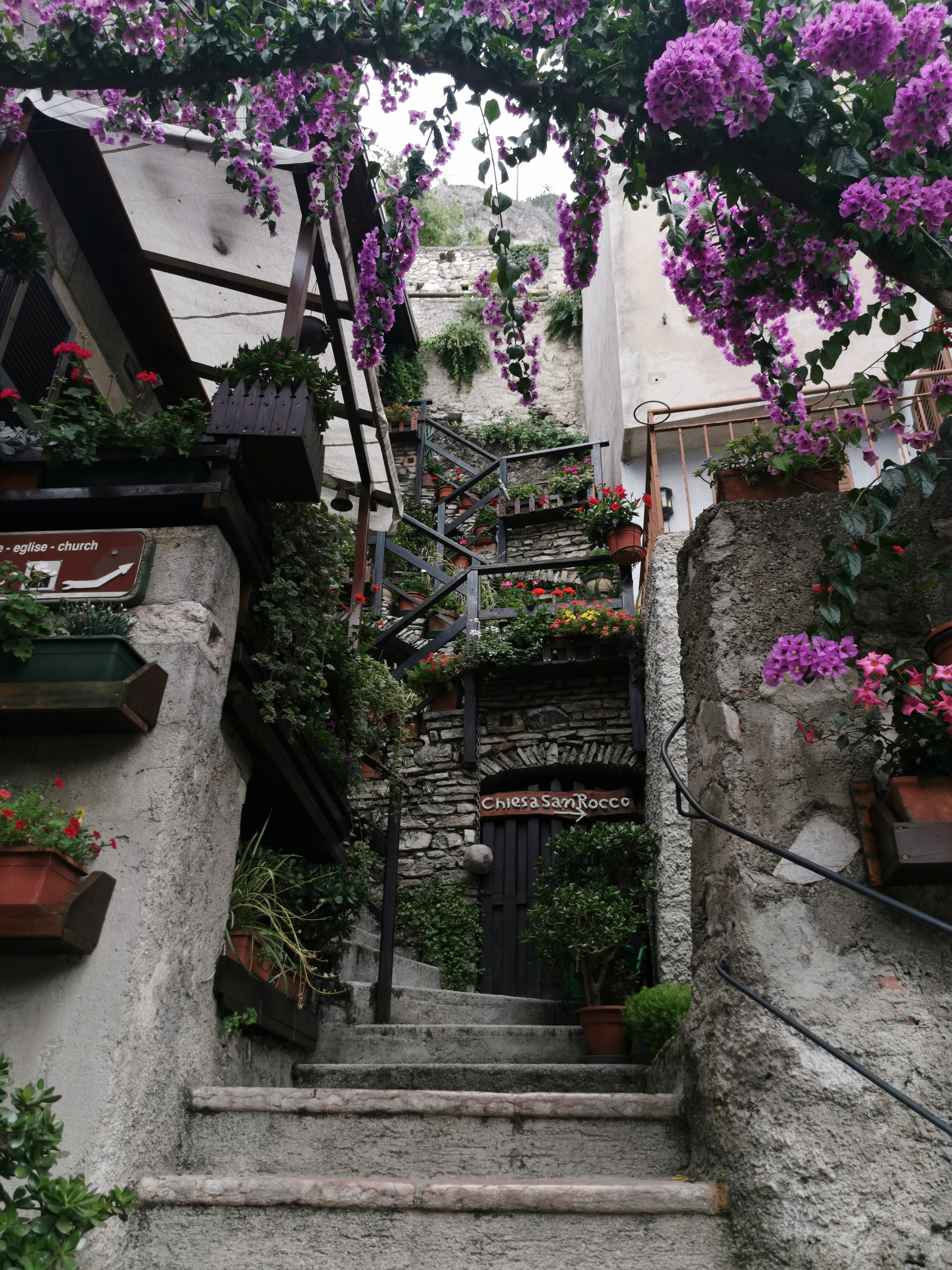

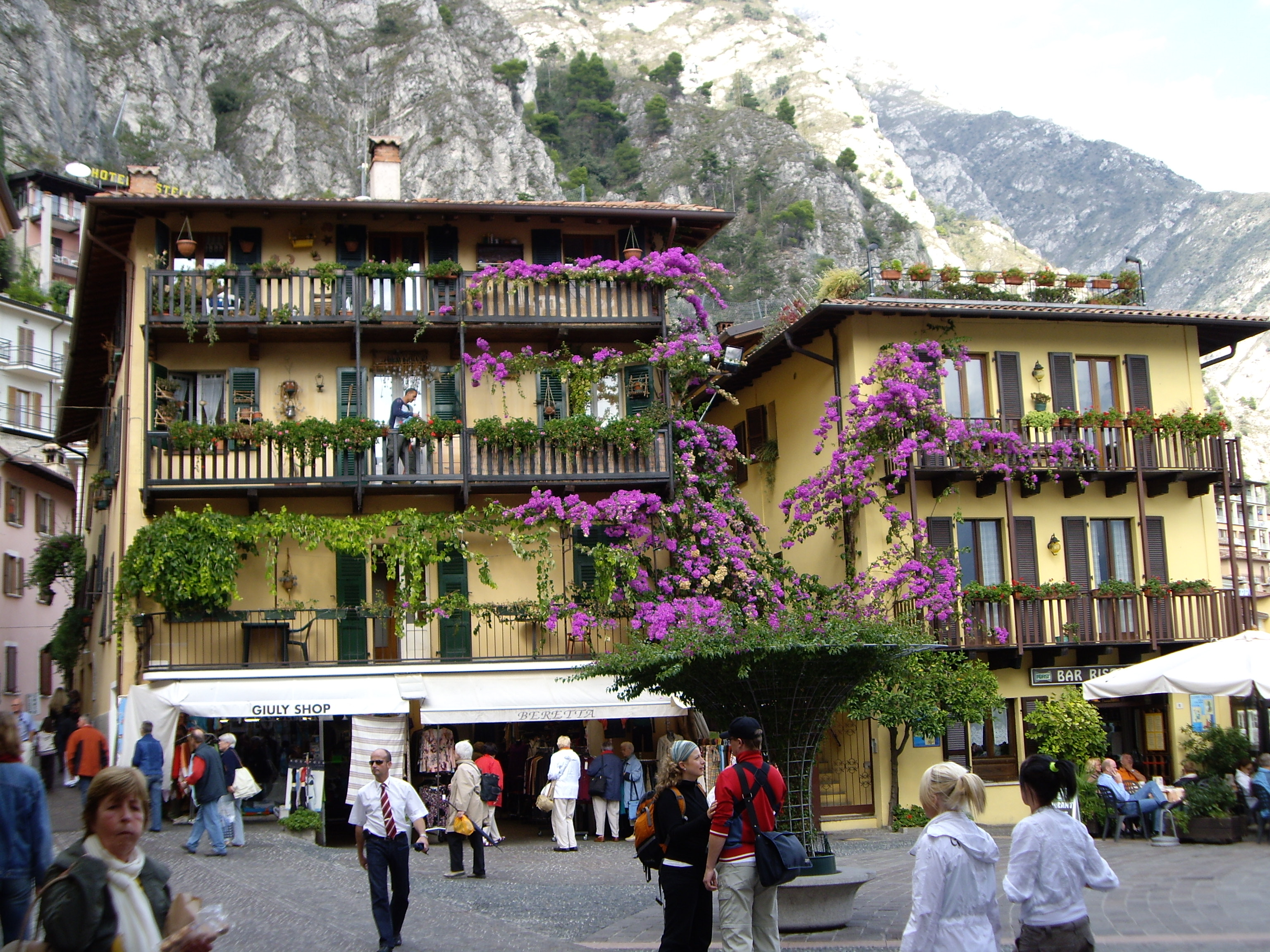

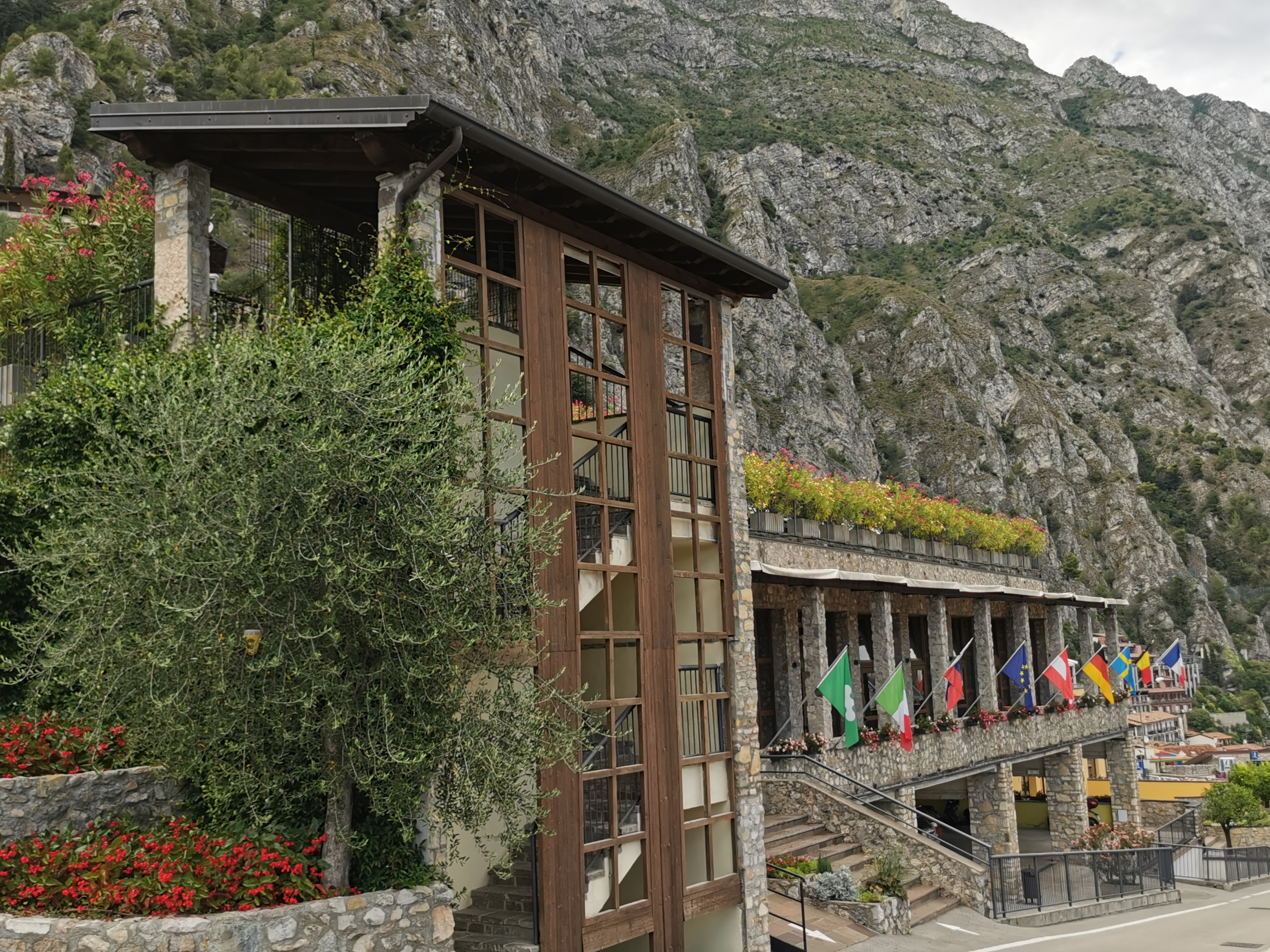
Town hall
