= Tasly =

Chinese pharmaceutical company

- Native name: 天士力控股集团 (Tiānshìlì Kònggǔ Jítuán)
- Industry: Pharmaceutical industry
- Founded: 1994
- Headquarters: Tianjin, China
- Website: www.tasly.com

Tasly (Chinese: 天士力控股集团; pinyin: Tiānshìlì Kònggǔ Jítuán) is a Chinese pharmaceutical company based in the city of Tianjin. It was established in 1994 and is notably producing traditional Chinese medicines.

It has a turnover of 4 billion US dollars, 10,000 employees and is listed on the Shanghai Stock Exchange.

In 2009, Chinese pharmacologist Li Lianda claimed that a key product made by Tasly was unsafe. Tasly sued Li in 2013, alleging that Li's claim was baseless and was motivated by his financial and employment relations with Guangzhou Pharmaceutical, a direct competitor of Tasly. In September 2014, the Tianjin High People's Court ruled in favour of Tasly and ordered Li to issue an apology and pay Tasly 300,000 yuan in compensation.

In February 2017, Tasly announced plans to form a joint venture with American multi-level marketing company Herbalife.

== See also ==
- Pharmaceutical industry in China
- Tianshili Station
