= Xanthomatous biliary cirrhosis =

- Other names: Obstructive liver disease,

Xanthomatous biliary cirrhosis, is a condition in which there is hyperlipoproteinemia due to liver disease resulting in plane xanthomas.

== See also ==
- Skin lesion
