= Lipaemia retinalis =

Retinal disease caused by high amounts of triglycerides in the blood

- Other names: Lipemia retinalis
- Specialty: Ophthalmology, Endocrinology
- Causes: Hypertriglyceridemia
- Diagnostic method: Ophthalmoscopy
- Treatment: Diet control, Insulin treatment

Lipaemia retinalis (LR) also spelled as Lipemia retinalis is an eye disease caused by high amounts of triglycerides in the blood (hypertriglyceridemia) or Lipoprotein lipase deficiency (chylomicronemia). In this condition the retinal arteries and veins, and occasionally the entire fundus shows creamy-white to salmon-red discoloration.

== Signs and symptoms ==
In early stage of lipaemia retinalis, creamy-white discoloration of retinal blood vessels occurs and in extreme cases the fundus become salmon red colour. Retinal changes occur in the peripheral vessels, gradually progress to entire fundus. Symptoms are caused by an increase in the level of chylomicron in the retinal circulation. Though visual acuity is not affected, electroretinogram amplitude may be decreased.

Since acute increase in triglyceride may be asymptomatic at first, retinal signs of LR are an important clinical sign of hypertriglyceridemia.

== Cause ==
Lipaemia retinalis is a retinal disease caused by hypertriglyceridemia or chylomicronemia. Depending on plasma triglyceride level, the retinal arteries, veins or occasionally the entire fundus may show creamy-white to salmon-red discoloration. In primary hyperlipidaemia, LR occurs only in patients with increased chylomicron levels.

Lipaemia retinalis occurs commonly with familial hypertriglyceridaemia, and rarely with combined hypertriglyceridaemia. Although serum triglyceride levels above 1000 mg / dL can cause eye symptoms such as xanthoma, xanthelasma and arcus senilis, lipaemia retinalis is most commonly seen when the triglyceride level is above 1500 mg / dL. Changes in fundus are more pronounced when triglyceride levels exceed 2,500 mg / dL.

== Grading ==
Vinger and Sachs classified lipaemia retinalis into three grades. Early lipaemia retinalis with creamy white discoloration of peripheral retinal vessels is classified as Grade 1. When the discoloration extends towards optic disc, it is graded as Grade 2 and when retina becomes salmon red it is classified as Grade 3.

== Treatment ==
When the serum triglyceride is under control by proper dietary control and or insulin, the changes in the retina and electroretinogram changes return to normal.

== Epidemiology ==
According to Brunzell and Bierman, lipaemia retinalis occurs in 23% of patients with chylomicronaemia and they says it may be considered as a rare disease only because of lack of routine fundoscopic examination.

== History ==
In 1880, Heyl first described lipaemia retinalis and in 1970 Vinger and Sachs introduced a grading system to describe its stages.

== Other animals ==
Increase in serum triglyceride can cause lipaemia retinalis in cats also.
