= Xanthoma striatum palmare =

- Specialty: Dermatology

Xanthoma striatum palmare is a cutaneous condition characterized by xanthomas of the palmar creases which are almost diagnostic for dysbetalipoproteinemia.

Xanthomas consist of accumulations of lipids within macrophages deposited within the dermis of the skin.

== See also ==
- Xanthoma tendinosum
- List of cutaneous conditions
- List of xanthoma variants associated with hyperlipoproteinemia subtypes
