= Eye ring =

Eye ring may refer to:

- eye ring, also called a "lover's eye ring", an antique type of ring
- eye-ring, a circle of tiny, contrasting feathers that outline the eyes of some birds.
- limbal ring, a dark ring around the iris of the eye, where the sclera meets the cornea.
- periorbital dark circles, dark blemishes around the eyes.
- scleral ring, a ring of cartilage or bone that surrounds the eyes of many vertebrate animals, most notably birds, some ancient crocodiles, non-avian dinosaurs, lizards, snakes, and turtles.
