= Lipoprotein lipase deficiency =

Genetic disorder in fat handling

- Other names: LPLD; familial chylomicronemia syndrome, chylomicronemia, chylomicronemia syndrome, familial hyperchylomicronemia, familial hyperchylomicronemia syndrome, hyperlipoproteinemia type Ia., type I hyperlipoproteinemia
- Lipoprotein lipase deficiency is inherited via autosomal recessive manner.
- Specialty: Endocrinology
- Causes: Genetic

Lipoprotein lipase deficiency is a genetic disorder in which a person has a defective gene for lipoprotein lipase, which leads to very high triglycerides, which in turn causes stomach pain and deposits of fat under the skin, and which can lead to problems with the pancreas and liver, which in turn can lead to diabetes. The disorder occurs only if a child inherits the defective gene from both parents (it is autosomal recessive). It is managed by restricting fat in the diet to less than 20 g/day.

== Signs and symptoms ==
The disease often presents in infancy with colicky pain, failure to thrive, and other symptoms and signs of the chylomicronemia syndrome. In women, the use of estrogens or first pregnancy are also well known trigger factors for initial manifestation of LPLD. At all ages, the most common clinical manifestation is recurrent abdominal pain and acute pancreatitis. The pain may be epigastric, with radiation to the back, or it may be diffuse, with the appearance of an emergent acute abdomen. Other typical symptoms are eruptive xanthomas (in about 50% of patients), lipaemia retinalis, and hepatosplenomegaly.

=== Complications ===
Patients with LPLD are at high risk of acute pancreatitis, which can be life-threatening and can lead to chronic pancreatic insufficiency and diabetes.

== Diagnosis ==
Lab tests show massive accumulation of chylomicrons in the plasma and corresponding severe hypertriglyceridemia. Typically, the plasma in a fasting blood sample appears creamy (plasma lactescence).

Familial LPL deficiency should be considered in anyone with severe hypertriglyceridemia and the chylomicronemia syndrome. The absence of secondary causes of severe hypertriglyceridemia (e.g., diabetes, alcohol, estrogen-, glucocorticoid-, antidepressant-, or isotretinoin-therapy, certain antihypertensive agents, and paraproteinemic disorders) increases the possibility of LPL deficiency. In this instance, besides LPL, other loss-of-function mutations in genes that regulate catabolism of triglyceride-rich lipoproteins (e.g., ApoC2, ApoA5, LMF-1, GPIHBP-1, GPD1) should also be considered.

The diagnosis of familial lipoprotein lipase deficiency is finally confirmed by the detection of either homozygous or compound heterozygous pathogenic gene variants in LPL with either low or absent lipoprotein lipase enzyme activity.

Lipid measurements

· Milky, lipemic plasma revealing severe hyperchylomicronemia;

· Severely elevated fasting plasma triglycerides (>2000 mg/dL);

LPL enzyme

· Low or absent LPL activity in post-heparin plasma;

· LPL mass level reduced or absent in post-heparin plasma;

Molecular genetic testing The LPL gene is located on the short (p) arm of chromosome 8 at position 22. More than 220 mutations in the LPL gene have been found to cause familial lipoprotein lipase deficiency so far.

== Treatment ==
Treatment of LPLD has two different objectives: immediate prevention of pancreatitis attacks and long-term reduction of cardiovascular disease risk.

Olezarsen (Tryngolza) was approved for medical use in the United States in December 2024.

=== Gene therapy ===
In 2012, the European Commission approved alipogene tiparvovec (Glybera), a gene therapy for adults with familial LPLD (confirmed by genetic testing) and having severe or multiple pancreatitis attacks despite dietary fat restrictions. It is the first gene therapy to receive marketing authorization in the European Union; it was priced at about $1 million per treatment, and as of 2016, only one person had been treated with it commercially. A total of 31 people were treated with Glybera, most for free in clinical trials before it was taken off the market.

== Incidence ==
The disorder affects about 1 out of 1,000,000 people; however, epidemiological data are limited, and there are regional differences due to founder effect (e.g., in Canada) or intermarriage.

== See also ==
- Primary hyperlipoproteinemia
- Familial apoprotein CII deficiency
- List of cutaneous conditions
