= Hyperalphalipoproteinemia =

- Other names: HALP, Familial Hyperalphalipoproteinemia
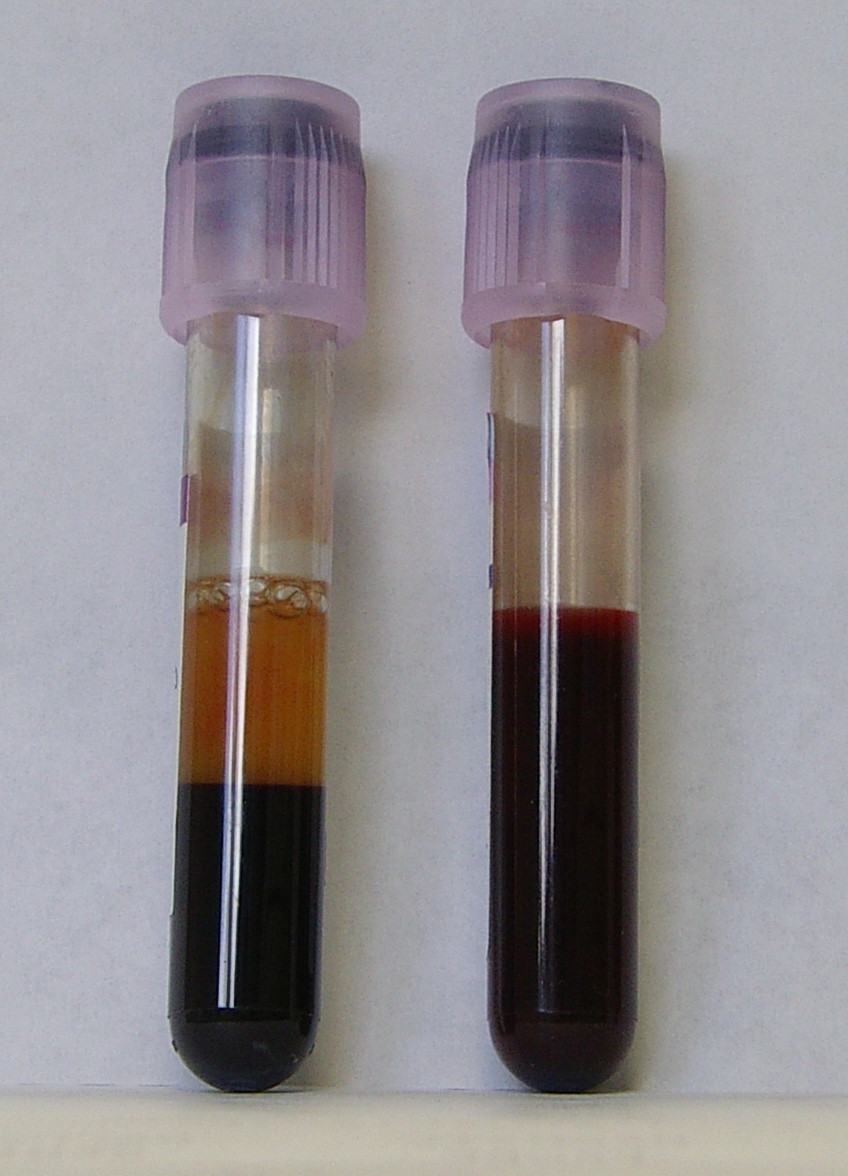
- Two 4-ml samples of hyperlipidemic blood in a vacutainer with EDTA. The left tube has lipids separated into the top fraction after being left to settle for four hours without centrifugation. The right tube before centrifugation
- Specialty: Cardiology
- Differential diagnosis: Hypertriglyceridemia Hyperlipidemia

Hyperalphalipoproteinemia (HALP) is abnormally high levels of high-density-lipoprotein cholesterol (HDL-C) in plasma above the 90th percentile of values in the general population. Hyperalphalipoproteinemia represents a subset of dyslipidemia disorders and a superset of hypercholesterolemia. Hyperalphalipoproteinemia is a chronic disorder that is typically asymptomatic but epidemiological studies have shown contradictory results on the relationship between high density lipoprotein levels and cardiovascular risk in subjects with primary HALP.

== Signs and symptoms ==
Hyperalphalipoproteinemia, on its own, is almost entirely asymptomatic. However, Extremely high levels of High-density lipoprotein categorized by Hyperalphalipoproteinemia, and can predispose one to more serious medical issues, including higher rates of cardiovascular disease.

== Causes ==
The major causes of hyperalphalipoproteinemia are various genetic mutations causing Apolipoprotein A-I overproduction and Apolipoprotein C-III variants leading to higher levels of High-density lipoprotein. Individuals with a genetic predisposition for hyperalphalipoproteinemia or a family history are at a greater risk for this disease.

== High-density-lipoprotein Cholesterol ==
High-density lipoprotein (HDL) is one of the five main lipoproteins, composed of multiple proteins that carry fats (lipids) all around the body's cells. It is generally considered to as "good cholesterol" because they transport fat molecules out of artery walls, reduce macrophage accumulation, and thus help prevent or even regress atherosclerosis. It can be affected by behavioral or genetic factors, including tobacco use, obesity, inactivity, hypertriglyceridemia, diabetes, high carbohydrate diet, medication side effects (beta-blockers, anabolic steroids, progestins, benzodiazepines) and genetic mutations. Extremely high levels are categorized as greater than100 mg/dL. While low levels are categorized as less than 40 mg/dL.
