= Olezarsen =

Medication

Clinical data
- Trade names: Tryngolza
- Other names: IONIS-APOCIII-LRX
- AHFS/Drugs.com: Monograph
- MedlinePlus: a625020
- License data: US DailyMed: Olezarsen
- Routes of administration: Subcutaneous
- Drug class: Antisense oligonucleotide
- ATC code: None

Legal status
- Legal status: CA: ℞-only; US: ℞-only; EU: Rx-only

Identifiers
- IUPAC name: all-P-ambo-5'-O-(((6-(5-((tris(3-(6-(2-acetamido-2-deoxy-β-D-galactopyranosyloxy)hexylamino)-3-oxopropoxymethyl))methyl)amino-5-oxopentanamido)hexyl))phospho)-2'-O-(2-methoxyethyl)-P-thioadenylyl-(3'→5')-2'-O-(2-methoxyethyl)-P-thioguanylyl-(3'→5')-2'-O-(2-methoxyethyl)-5-methyl-P-thiocytidylyl-(3'→5')-2'-O-(2-methoxyethyl)-5-methyl-P-thiouridylyl-(3'→5')-2'-O-(2-methoxyethyl)-5-methyl-P-thiouridylyl-(3'→5')-2'-deoxy-5-methyl-P-thiocytidylyl-(3'→5')-P-thiothymidylyl-(3'→5')-P-thiothymidylyl-(3'→5')-2'-deoxy-P-thioguanylyl-(3'→5')-P-thiothymidylyl-(3'→5')-2'-deoxy-5-methyl-P-thiocytidylyl-(3'→5')-2'-deoxy-5-methyl-P-thiocytidylyl-(3'→5')-2'-deoxy-P-thioadenylyl-(3'→5')-2'-deoxy-P-thioguanylyl-(3'→5')-2'-deoxy-5-methyl-P-thiocytidylyl-(3'→5')-2'-O-(2-methoxyethyl)-5-methyl-P-thiouridylyl-(3'→5')-2'-O-(2-methoxyethyl)-5-methyl-P-thiouridylyl-(3'→5')-2'-O-(2-methoxyethyl)-5-methyl-P-thiouridylyl-(3'→5')-2'-O-(2-methoxyethyl)-P-thioadenylyl-(3'→5')-2'-O-(2-methoxyethyl)-5-methyluridine
- CAS Number: 2097587-83-0; 2298451-31-5
- DrugBank: DB18728
- UNII: S3RS2SA30L; NSY2BY6PSB
- KEGG: D13023

Chemical and physical data
- Formula: C_{296}H_{439}N_{71}O_{154}P_{20}S_{19}
- Molar mass: 8684.73 g·mol^{−1}
- SMILES: COCCO[C@@H]1[C@H](O)[C@@H](COP(O)(=S)O[C@H]2[C@@H](OCCOC)[C@H](n3cnc4c(N)ncnc43)O[C@@H]2COP(O)(=S)O[C@H]2[C@@H](OCCOC)[C@H](n3cc(C)c(=O)[nH]c3=O)O[C@@H]2COP(O)(=S)O[C@H]2[C@@H](OCCOC)[C@H](n3cc(C)c(=O)[nH]c3=O)O[C@@H]2COP(O)(=S)O[C@H]2[C@@H](OCCOC)[C@H](n3cc(C)c(=O)[nH]c3=O)O[C@@H]2COP(O)(=S)O[C@H]2C[C@H](n3cc(C)c(N)nc3=O)O[C@@H]2COP(O)(=S)O[C@H]2C[C@H](n3cnc4c(=O)[nH]c(N)nc43)O[C@@H]2COP(O)(=S)O[C@H]2C[C@H](n3cnc4c(N)ncnc43)O[C@@H]2COP(O)(=S)O[C@H]2C[C@H](n3cc(C)c(N)nc3=O)O[C@@H]2COP(O)(=S)O[C@H]2C[C@H](n3cc(C)c(N)nc3=O)O[C@@H]2COP(O)(=S)O[C@H]2C[C@H](n3cc(C)c(=O)[nH]c3=O)O[C@@H]2COP(O)(=S)O[C@H]2C[C@H](n3cnc4c(=O)[nH]c(N)nc43)O[C@@H]2COP(O)(=S)O[C@H]2C[C@H](n3cc(C)c(=O)[nH]c3=O)O[C@@H]2COP(O)(=S)O[C@H]2C[C@H](n3cc(C)c(=O)[nH]c3=O)O[C@@H]2COP(O)(=S)O[C@H]2C[C@H](n3cc(C)c(N)nc3=O)O[C@@H]2COP(O)(=S)O[C@H]2[C@@H](OCCOC)[C@H](n3cc(C)c(=O)[nH]c3=O)O[C@@H]2COP(O)(=S)O[C@H]2[C@@H](OCCOC)[C@H](n3cc(C)c(=O)[nH]c3=O)O[C@@H]2COP(O)(=S)O[C@H]2[C@@H](OCCOC)[C@H](n3cc(C)c(N)nc3=O)O[C@@H]2COP(O)(=S)O[C@H]2[C@@H](OCCOC)[C@H](n3cnc4c(=O)[nH]c(N)nc43)O[C@@H]2COP(O)(=S)O[C@H]2[C@@H](OCCOC)[C@H](n3cnc4c(N)ncnc43)O[C@@H]2COP(=O)(O)OCCCCCCNC(=O)CCCC(=O)NCC(COCCC(=O)NCCCCCCO[C@@H]2O[C@H](CO)[C@H](O)[C@H](O)[C@H]2NC(C)=O)(COCCC(=O)NCCCCCCO[C@@H]2O[C@H](CO)[C@H](O)[C@H](O)[C@H]2NC(C)=O)OCCC(=O)NCCCCCCO[C@@H]2O[C@H](CO)[C@H](O)[C@H](O)[C@H]2NC(C)=O)O[C@H]1n1cc(C)c(=O)[nH]c1=O
- InChI: InChI=1S/C296H439N71O154P20S19/c1-140-91-348(282(398)328-240(140)297)195-81-157(503-523(414,542)461-108-171-158(82-196(481-171)349-92-141(2)241(298)329-283(349)399)504-527(418,546)467-114-177-164(88-202(487-177)362-134-319-208-245(302)313-131-316-248(208)362)510-531(422,550)469-116-179-166(90-204(489-179)364-136-323-212-252(364)334-280(306)337-264(212)396)511-529(420,548)465-110-172-159(83-197(482-172)350-93-142(3)242(299)330-284(350)400)509-532(423,551)472-120-182-222(232(447-73-63-435-20)268(492-182)357-100-149(10)258(390)343-291(357)407)515-536(427,555)474-123-185-225(234(449-75-65-437-22)270(494-185)359-102-151(12)260(392)345-293(359)409)518-539(430,558)476-125-187-227(236(451-77-67-439-24)272(496-187)361-104-153(14)262(394)347-295(361)411)519-540(431,559)478-126-188-228(238(453-79-69-441-26)274(498-188)366-138-321-210-247(304)315-133-318-250(210)366)520-534(425,553)471-118-180-217(382)230(445-71-61-433-18)266(490-180)356-99-148(9)257(389)342-290(356)406)170(480-195)109-462-525(416,544)506-162-86-200(353-97-146(7)255(387)340-288(353)404)486-175(162)113-466-530(421,549)512-165-89-203(363-135-322-211-251(363)333-279(305)336-263(211)395)488-178(165)115-468-528(419,547)508-163-87-201(354-98-147(8)256(388)341-289(354)405)485-174(163)112-464-526(417,545)507-161-85-199(352-96-145(6)254(386)339-287(352)403)484-173(161)111-463-524(415,543)505-160-84-198(351-94-143(4)243(300)331-285(351)401)483-176(160)117-470-533(424,552)514-224-184(493-269(233(224)448-74-64-436-21)358-101-150(11)259(391)344-292(358)408)122-473-538(429,557)517-226-186(495-271(235(226)450-76-66-438-23)360-103-152(13)261(393)346-294(360)410)124-475-537(428,556)516-223-183(491-267(231(223)446-72-62-434-19)355-95-144(5)244(301)332-286(355)402)121-477-541(432,560)521-229-189(499-275(239(229)454-80-70-442-27)367-139-324-213-253(367)335-281(307)338-265(213)397)127-479-535(426,554)513-221-181(497-273(237(221)452-78-68-440-25)365-137-320-209-246(303)314-132-317-249(209)365)119-460-522(412,413)459-57-43-35-31-39-50-308-190(374)45-44-46-191(375)312-128-296(458-60-49-194(378)311-53-38-30-34-42-56-457-278-207(327-156(17)373)220(385)216(381)169(107-370)502-278,129-443-58-47-192(376)309-51-36-28-32-40-54-455-276-205(325-154(15)371)218(383)214(379)167(105-368)500-276)130-444-59-48-193(377)310-52-37-29-33-41-55-456-277-206(326-155(16)372)219(384)215(380)168(106-369)501-277/h91-104,131-139,157-189,195-207,214-239,266-278,368-370,379-385H,28-90,105-130H2,1-27H3,(H,308,374)(H,309,376)(H,310,377)(H,311,378)(H,312,375)(H,325,371)(H,326,372)(H,327,373)(H,412,413)(H,414,542)(H,415,543)(H,416,544)(H,417,545)(H,418,546)(H,419,547)(H,420,548)(H,421,549)(H,422,550)(H,423,551)(H,424,552)(H,425,553)(H,426,554)(H,427,555)(H,428,556)(H,429,557)(H,430,558)(H,431,559)(H,432,560)(H2,297,328,398)(H2,298,329,399)(H2,299,330,400)(H2,300,331,401)(H2,301,332,402)(H2,302,313,316)(H2,303,314,317)(H2,304,315,318)(H,339,386,403)(H,340,387,404)(H,341,388,405)(H,342,389,406)(H,343,390,407)(H,344,391,408)(H,345,392,409)(H,346,393,410)(H,347,394,411)(H3,305,333,336,395)(H3,306,334,337,396)(H3,307,335,338,397)/t157-,158-,159-,160-,161-,162-,163-,164-,165-,166-,167+,168+,169+,170+,171+,172+,173+,174+,175+,176+,177+,178+,179+,180+,181+,182+,183+,184+,185+,186+,187+,188+,189+,195+,196+,197+,198+,199+,200+,201+,202+,203+,204+,205+,206+,207+,214-,215-,216-,217+,218+,219+,220+,221+,222+,223+,224+,225+,226+,227+,228+,229+,230+,231+,232+,233+,234+,235+,236+,237+,238+,239+,266+,267+,268+,269+,270+,271+,272+,273+,274+,275+,276+,277+,278+,523?,524?,525?,526?,527?,528?,529?,530?,531?,532?,533?,534?,535?,536?,537?,538?,539?,540?,541?/m0/s1; Key:OXKUXVOOWUAAFP-WSMKVKJMSA-N

Olezarsen, sold under the brand name Tryngolza, is a medication used in the treatment of familial chylomicronemia syndrome. It is given by injection under the skin. Olezarsen is an apolipoprotein C-III-directed antisense oligonucleotide. Olezarsen is an antisense oligonucleotide which inhibits the formation of apolipoprotein C3 (apoC-III), a protein that regulates both triglyceride metabolism and liver clearance of chylomicrons and other triglyceride-rich lipoproteins. By reducing serum apoC-III, olezarsen increases clearance of plasma triglycerides.

The most common side effects include injection site reactions, low platelet counts, and joint pain.

Olezarsen was approved for medical use in the United States in December 2024. The US Food and Drug Administration considers it to be a first-in-class medication.

== Medical uses ==
Olezarsen is indicated as an adjunct to diet to reduce triglycerides in adults with familial chylomicronemia syndrome.

== Adverse effects ==
The most common side effects include injection site reactions, low platelet counts, and joint pain. There are some reports of allergic (hypersensitivity) reactions, including difficulty breathing, rash, facial swelling, hives, chills, and muscle aches.

== Pharmacology ==
Olezarsen is an apolipoprotein C-III-directed antisense oligonucleotide. By binding to apolipoprotein C-III mRNA, it causes its degradation, which in turn increases clearance of plasma triglycerides and very low-density lipoprotein (VLDL).

== History ==
The US Food and Drug Administration (FDA) granted the application of olezarsen orphan drug designation in February 2024. In August 2024, the European Medicines Agency granted olezarsen an orphan drug designation.

The FDA approved olezarsen based on evidence from a clinical trial (trial 1; NCT04568434) of 66 participants with familial chylomicronemia syndrome. The trial was conducted at 29 sites in 11 countries including Canada, France, Italy, Netherlands, Norway, Portugal, Slovakia, Spain, Sweden, the United Kingdom, and the United States. Of the 66 participants, 19 participants were from trial sites in the United States. The benefits and side effects of olezarsen for participants with familial chylomicronemia syndrome were evaluated in the same single clinical trial. Additional trials in participants with hypertriglyceridemia were used to support the safety assessment. The number of participants representing efficacy findings may differ from the number of participants representing safety findings due to different pools of study participants analyzed for efficacy and safety. Enrolled participants were already using other treatments to lower triglycerides, including a low-fat diet and medications (such as fenofibrates, omega-3 fatty acids, and statins). Participants were randomly assigned to receive olezarsen or placebo every four weeks for one year. Neither the participants nor the health care providers knew which treatment was being given.

== Society and culture ==
=== Legal status ===
Olezarsen was approved for medical use in the United States in December 2024.

In July 2025, the Committee for Medicinal Products for Human Use of the European Medicines Agency adopted a positive opinion, recommending the granting of a marketing authorization for the medicinal product Tryngolza, intended for the treatment of adults with familial chylomicronemia syndrome. The applicant for this medicinal product is Ionis Ireland Limited. Olezarsen was authorized for medical use in the European Union in September 2025.

=== Names ===
Olezarsen is the international nonproprietary name.

Olezarsen is sold under the brand name Tryngolza.
