= Combined hyperlipidemia =

- Other names: Multiple-type hyperlipoproteinemia
- Combined hyperlipidemia is inherited in an autosomal dominant manner.
- Specialty: Endocrinology

Combined hyperlipidemia (or -aemia) is a commonly occurring form of hypercholesterolemia (elevated cholesterol levels) characterised by increased LDL and triglyceride concentrations, often accompanied by decreased HDL. On lipoprotein electrophoresis (a test now rarely performed) it shows as a hyperlipoproteinemia type IIB. It is the most commonly inherited lipid disorder, occurring in around one in 200 persons. In fact, almost one in five individuals who develop coronary heart disease before the age of 60 have this disorder.

The elevated triglyceride levels (>5 mmol/L) are generally due to an increase in very low density lipoprotein (VLDL), a class of lipoproteins prone to cause atherosclerosis.

== Cause ==
Hereditary factors are the most common cause. A diet high in saturated fat and cholesterol increases blood cholesterol and triglyceride levels. Other disorders, such as diabetes mellitus, kidney disease, and hypothyroidism, may promote hypertriglyceridemia. Certain drugs, such as estrogen, corticosteroids, retinoids, protease inhibitors, thiazide diuretics, and beta-blockers, may cause hypertriglyceridemia. Obesity increases the risk of hyperlipidemia. Chronic, excessive alcohol use increases the risk of hypertriglyceridemia. Smoking and not exercising may lead to hyperlipidemia. Steroid uses, alcoholism, hypothyroidism, oral contraceptives, chronic kidney failure, hypopituitarism, and nephritic syndrome are other contributors to hyperlipidemia.

== Diagnosis ==
=== Types ===
The two forms of this lipid disorder are:

- Familial combined hyperlipidemia (FCH) is the familial occurrence of this disorder, probably caused by decreased LDL receptor and increased ApoB.
- Acquired combined hyperlipidemia is extremely common in patients who have other diseases from the metabolic syndrome ("syndrome X", incorporating diabetes mellitus type II, hypertension, central obesity and CH). Excessive free fatty acid production by various tissues leads to increased VLDL synthesis by the liver. Initially, most VLDL is converted into LDL until this mechanism is saturated, after which VLDL levels elevate.

== Treatment ==
Both conditions are treated with fibrate drugs, which act on the peroxisome proliferator-activated receptors (PPARs), specifically PPARα, to decrease free fatty acid production. Statin drugs, especially the synthetic statins (atorvastatin and rosuvastatin), can decrease LDL levels by increasing hepatic reuptake of LDL due to increased LDL-receptor expression.

== See also ==
- Hyperlipidemia – Abnormally elevated levels of lipids or lipoproteins in the blood
