= List of xanthoma variants associated with hyperlipoproteinemia subtypes =

When the cholesterol levels in the body rise above the normal level, a number of skin lesions can occur. Xanthomas are one of types of skin lesions that may occur in this situation.

Xanthoma variants associated with hyperlipoproteinemia subtypes
Xanthoma variant	Associated subtype(s)
Xanthoma striatum palmare	III
Plane xanthoma	II
Plane xanthoma specifically of the antecubital fossa and web spaces of the fingers	IIb
Eruptive xanthoma	I, IV, V
Tendinous xanthoma	II
Xanthelasma	II, III
Tuberous xanthoma	II, III

Other systemic conditions may also occur with increased levels of cholesterol in the blood.

Systemic conditions associated with hyperlipoproteinemia subtypes
Systemic condition	Associated subtype(s)
Lipaemia retinalis	I, V
Hepatosplenomegaly	I, V
Pancreatitis	I, V
Cerebral vascular accident	II, III, IV
Coronary artery disease	II, III, IV

== See also ==
- List of cutaneous conditions
- List of contact allergens
- List of cutaneous conditions associated with increased risk of nonmelanoma skin cancer
- List of cutaneous conditions associated with internal malignancy
- List of cutaneous conditions caused by mutations in keratins
- List of cutaneous conditions caused by problems with junctional proteins
- List of dental abnormalities associated with cutaneous conditions
- List of genes mutated in cutaneous conditions
- List of histologic stains that aid in diagnosis of cutaneous conditions
- List of immunofluorescence findings for autoimmune bullous conditions
- List of inclusion bodies that aid in diagnosis of cutaneous conditions
- List of keratins expressed in the human integumentary system
- List of radiographic findings associated with cutaneous conditions
- List of specialized glands within the human integumentary system
- List of target antigens in pemphigoid
- List of target antigens in pemphigus
