= Familial dysbetalipoproteinemia =

- Other names: Remnant hyperlipidemia, Remnant hyperlipoproteinaemia, Broad beta disease and Remnant removal disease
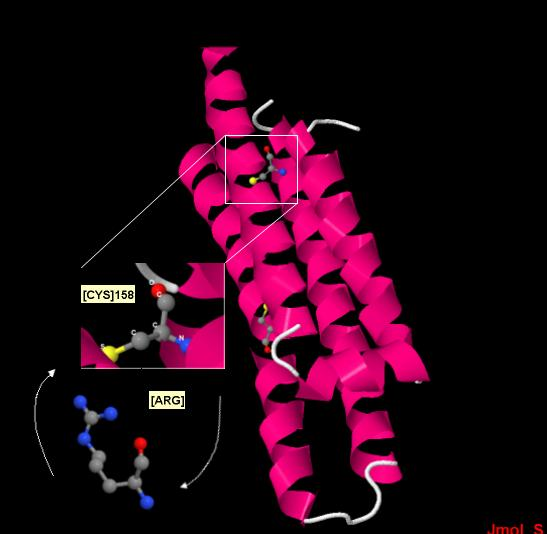
- Familial dysbetalipoproteinemia is caused by this point mutation in ApoE
- Specialty: Medical genetics, endocrinology

Familial dysbetalipoproteinemia or type III hyperlipoproteinemia is a condition characterized by increased total cholesterol and triglyceride levels, and decreased HDL levels.

== Signs and symptoms ==
Signs of familial dysbetaproteinemia include xanthoma striatum palmare (orange or yellow discoloration of the palms) and tuberoeruptive xanthomas over the elbows and knees. The disease leads to premature atherosclerosis and therefore a possible early onset of coronary artery disease and peripheral vascular disease leading to a heart attack, i.e. myocardial infarction, chest pain on exercise, i.e. angina pectoris or stroke in young adults or middle aged patients.

== Causes ==
This condition is more likely when a mutation in apolipoprotein E (ApoE) is present. ApoE serves as a ligand for the liver receptor for chylomicrons, IDL and VLDL, also known as very-low-density-lipoprotein receptor. Individuals with two copies of the ApoE2 gene have substantially elevated risk of this condition. This defect prevents the normal metabolism of chylomicrons, IDL and VLDL, otherwise known as remnants, and therefore leads to accumulation of cholesterol within scavenger cells (macrophages) to enhance development and acceleration of atherosclerosis.

== Treatment ==
First line of management is fibrates.

== See also ==
- Primary hyperlipoproteinemia
- Apolipoprotein B deficiency
- List of cutaneous conditions
