= Xanthoma diabeticorum =

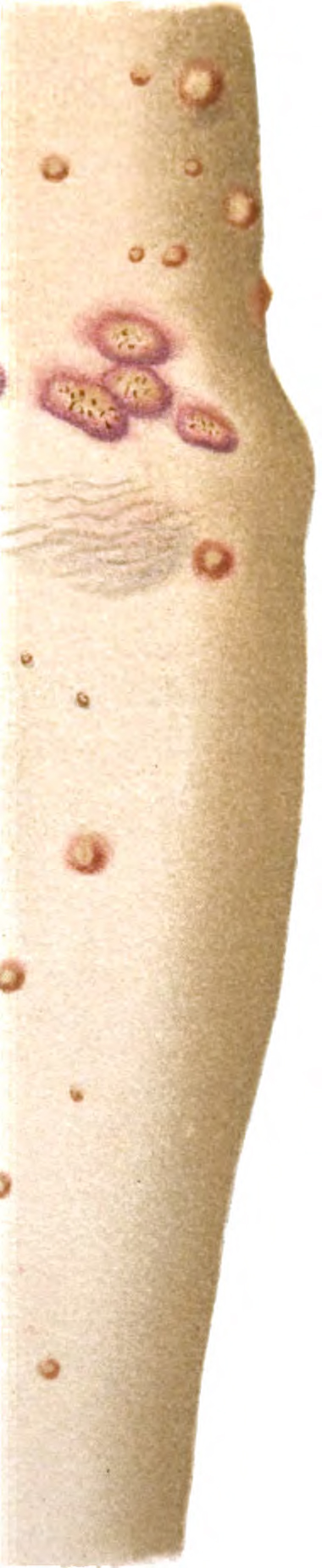
- Xanthoma diabetacorum
- Specialty: Dermatology

Xanthoma diabeticorum is a cutaneous condition that may result in young persons who are unresponsive to insulin.

== See also ==
- Xanthoma
- Skin lesion
