= The International League of Dermatological Societies =

Organization that promotes skin health

The International League of Dermatological Societies (ILDS) is a non-governmental organization that works closely with the World Health Organization. It was founded in 1935, but because of World War II no congresses were held until 1952. It is governed by the International Committee of Dermatology.

The ILDS is the parent organization of the International Foundation for Dermatology, founded in 1987.

After the publication of ICD-10, the ILDS produced a series of compatible extensions for use in dermatology.
