= Limbal ring =

Dark ring around the iris of the eye

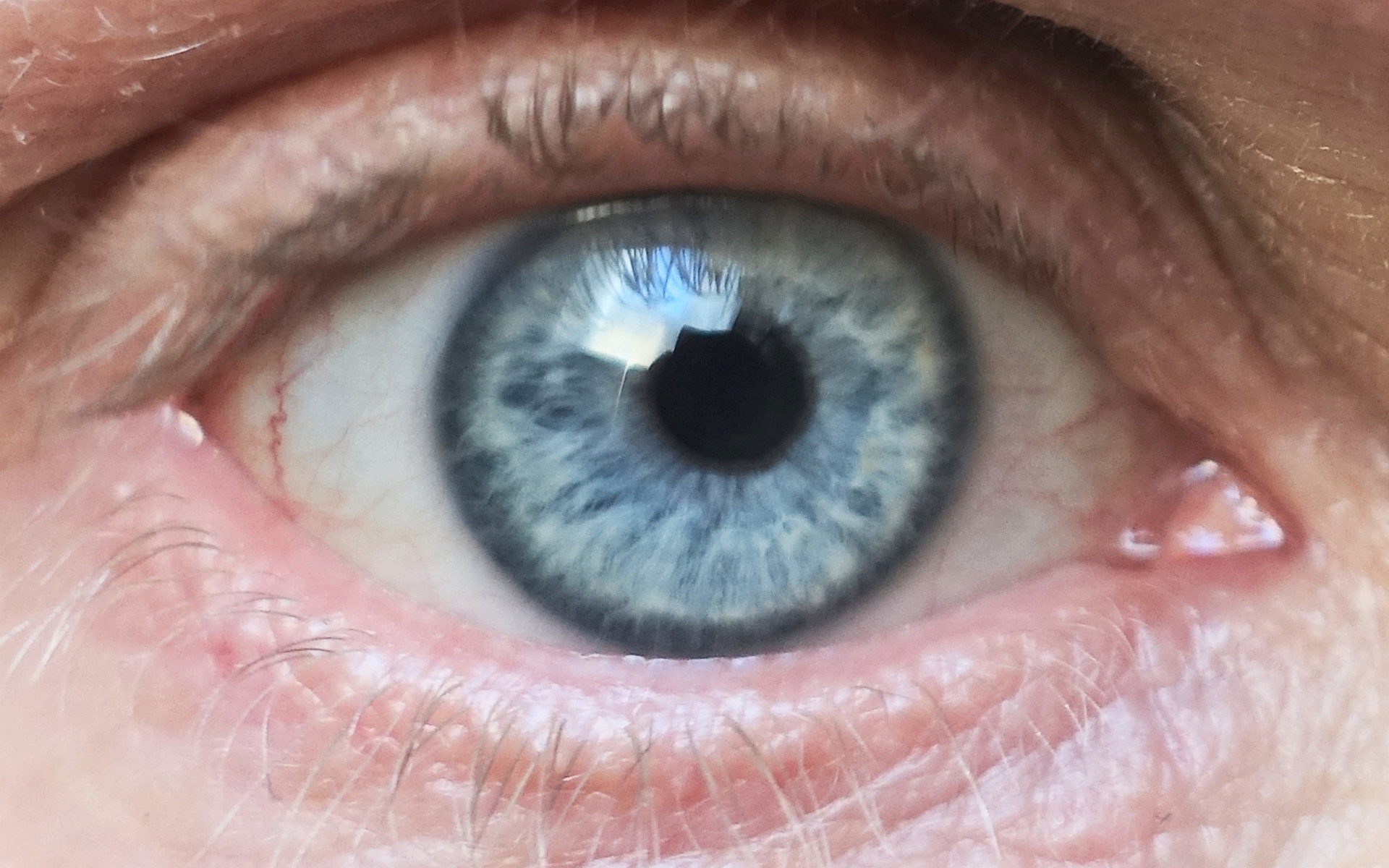
Prominent limbal ring

A limbal ring is a dark ring around the iris of the eye, where the sclera meets the cornea. It is a dark-colored manifestation of the corneal limbus resulting from optical properties of the region. The appearance and visibility of the limbal ring can be negatively affected by a variety of medical conditions concerning the peripheral cornea. It has been suggested that limbal ring thickness may correlate with perception of health or youthfulness and may contribute to facial attractiveness. The thickness of the limbal ring varies by pupil dilation: When the pupil is larger, the limbal ring narrows. Some contact lenses are colored to simulate limbal rings.

== Youth, health, and attractiveness ==
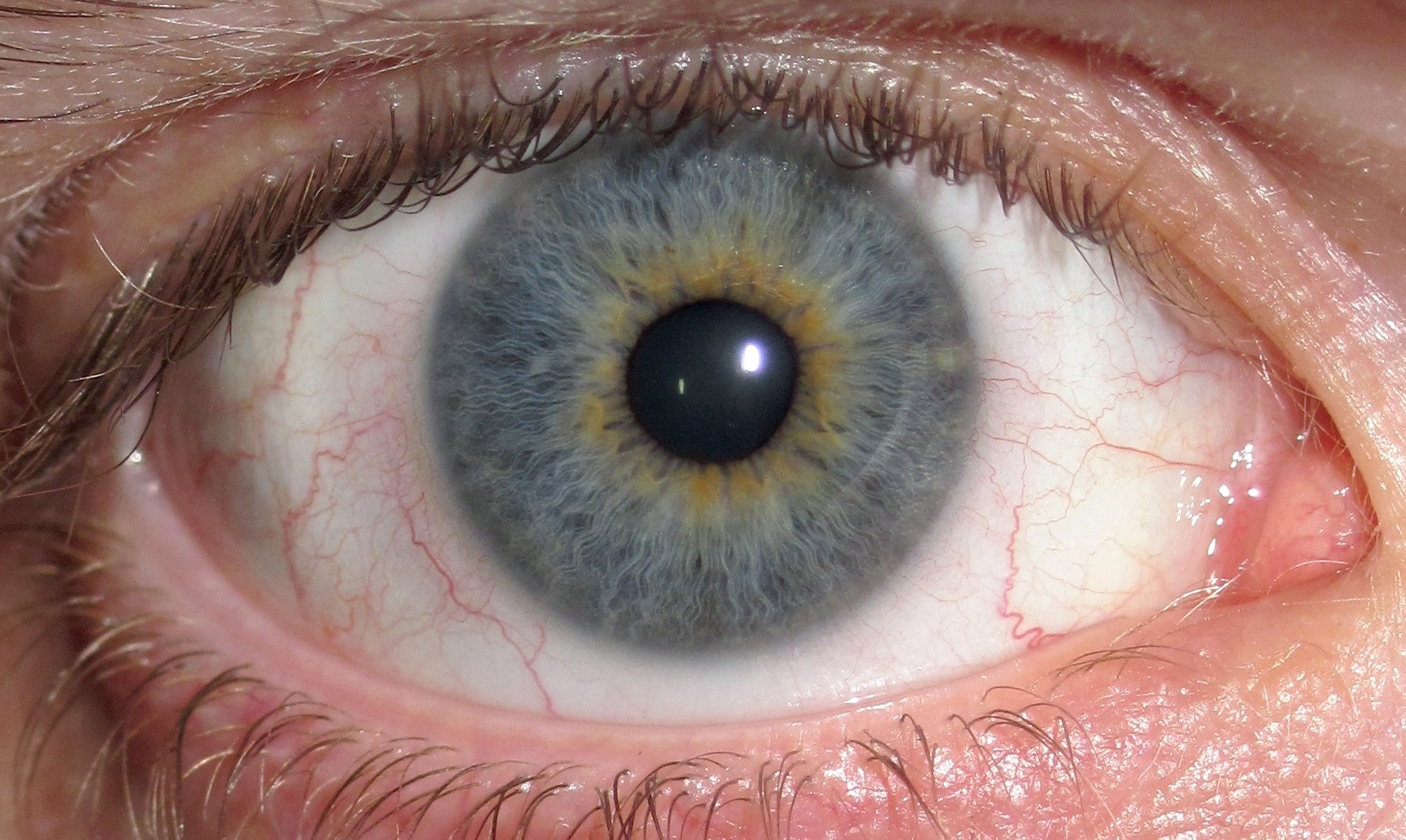
Blue eye without a limbal ring

Both health and youth are positively correlated with a prominent limbal ring. For instance, a darker limbal ring tends to be found more attractive than the absence of a limbal ring, suggesting that both sexes "use the limbal ring as a probabilistic indicator of reproductive fitness". Furthermore, limbal rings appear to be most noticeable "for individuals relatively free from chronic health issues".

The limbal ring is thought to contain corneal epithelium stem cells. Diseases involving a limbal stem cell deficiency are associated with blindness, as those with such deficiencies are "unable to maintain a stable corneal surface". Transplantation of limbal stem cells is a promising therapy for limbal stem cell deficiency.

== See also ==
- Circle contact lens
- Corneal limbus
- Limbus sign
