= Limbus sign =

- Differential diagnosis: increased calcium concentration in the blood

The limbus sign is a ring of dystrophic calcification evident as a "milky precipitate" (i.e. abnormal white color) at the corneal limbus. The corneal limbus is the part of the eye where the cornea (front/center) meets the sclera (white part of the eye). Thought to be caused by increased calcium concentration in the blood, this sign however persists after calcium phosphate concentration returns to normal. Compare the limbus sign (calcification) with arcus senilis (lipid).
