= Xanthelasma =

- Other names: xanthelasma palpebrarum; xanthoma palpebrarum
- Pronunciation: /ˌzænθɪˈlæzmə/
- Specialty: Ophthalmology

Xanthelasma is a sharply demarcated yellowish deposit of cholesterol underneath the skin. It usually occurs on or around the eyelids (xanthelasma palpebrarum, abbreviated XP). While they are neither harmful to the skin nor painful, these minor growths may be disfiguring and can be removed. There is a growing body of evidence for the association between xanthelasma deposits and blood low-density lipoprotein levels and increased risk of atherosclerosis.

A xanthelasma may be referred to as a xanthoma when becoming larger and nodular, assuming tumorous proportions. Xanthelasma is often classified simply as a subtype of xanthoma.

== Diagnosis ==
Xanthelasma in the form of XP can be diagnosed from clinical impression, although in some cases it may need to be distinguished (differential diagnosis) from other conditions, especially necrobiotic xanthogranuloma, syringoma, palpebral sarcoidosis, sebaceous hyperplasia, Erdheim–Chester disease, lipoid proteinosis (Urbach–Wiethe disease), and the syndrome of adult-onset asthma and periocular xanthogranuloma (AAPOX). Differential diagnosis can be accomplished by surgical excision followed by microscopic examination by a pathologist (biopsy to determine histopathology). The typical clinical impression of XP is soft, yellowish papules, plaques, or nodules, symmetrically distributed on the medial side of the upper eyelids; sometimes the lower eyelids are affected as well.

== Treatment ==
Xanthelasmata can be removed with a trichloroacetic acid peel, surgery, lasers or cryotherapy. Removal may cause, although uncommon, scarring and pigment changes.

== Prognosis ==
Recurrence is common: 40% of patients with XP had recurrence after primary surgical excision, 60% after secondary excision, and 80% when all four eyelids were involved. A possible cause might be insufficiently deep excisions.

== Epidemiology ==
Xanthelasma is a rare disorder in the general population, with a variable incidence of 0.56 to 1.5% in western developed countries. The age of onset ranges from 15 to 75, with a peak in the 4th to 5th decades of life. There also seems to be a greater prevalence in females, but this might be due to higher consciousness to cosmetic defects.

== Etymology ==
The word is derived from Greek xanthós, ξανθός 'yellow' and élasma, έλασμα, 'foil'. The plural is xanthelasmata.

== See also ==
- Xanthoma, a similar collection of cholesterol around tendons
- List of xanthoma variants associated with hyperlipoproteinemia subtypes
