= Xanthoma =

Deposit of cholesterol within bodily tissue

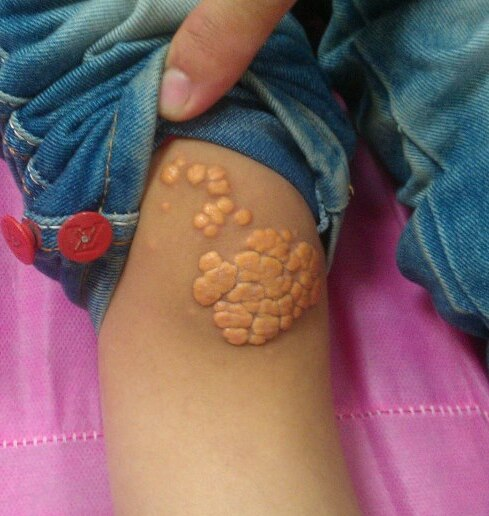
- A patient's knee showing multiple xanthoma tuberosum
- Specialty: Gastroenterology, dermatology

A xanthoma (pl. xanthomas or xanthomata) (condition: xanthomatosis) is a deposition of yellowish cholesterol-rich material that can appear anywhere in the body in various disease states. They are cutaneous manifestations of lipidosis in which lipids accumulate in large foam cells within the skin. They are associated with hyperlipidemias, both primary and secondary types.

Tendon xanthomas are associated with type II hyperlipidemia, chronic biliary tract obstruction, primary biliary cirrhosis, sitosterolemia and the rare metabolic disease cerebrotendineous xanthomatosis. Palmar xanthomata and tuberoeruptive xanthomata (over knees and elbows) occur in type III hyperlipidemia.

== Etymology ==
The term xanthoma stems from Greek ξανθός (xanthós) 'yellow', and -ωμα -oma, a suffix forming nouns indicating a mass or tumor.

== Types ==
=== Xanthelasma ===
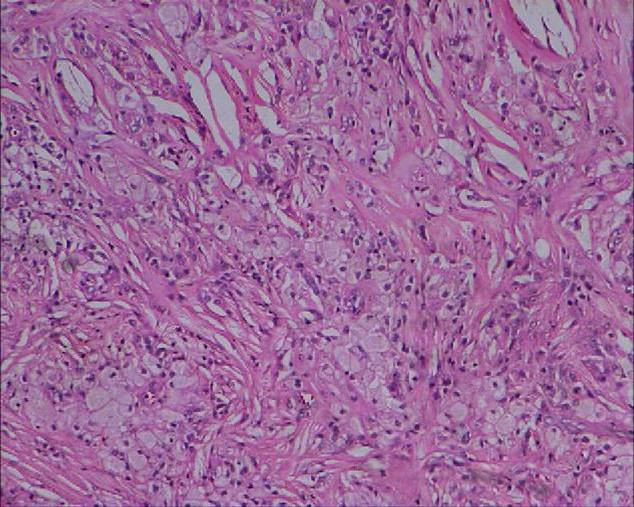
Histology picture of xanthoma showing lipid-laden foam cells with large areas of cholesterol clefts, 10 × magnification, eosin and hematoxylin stain

A xanthelasma is a sharply demarcated yellowish collection of cholesterol underneath the skin, usually on or around the eyelids. Strictly, a xanthelasma is a distinct condition, being called a xanthoma only when becoming larger and nodular, assuming tumorous proportions. Still, it is often classified simply as a subtype of xanthoma.

=== Xanthoma tuberosum ===
Xanthoma tuberosum (also known as tuberous xanthoma) is characterized by xanthomas located over tuberosity of the joints.

=== Xanthoma tendinosum ===
Xanthoma tendinosum (also tendon xanthoma or tendinous xanthoma) is clinically characterized by papules and nodules found in the tendons of the hands, feet, and heel. Also associated with familial hypercholesterolemia (FH).

=== Eruptive xanthoma ===
Eruptive xanthoma (ILDS E78.220) is clinically characterized by small, yellowish-orange to reddish-brown papules surrounded by an erythematous halo that appear suddenly all over the body, especially the hands, buttocks, and the extensor surfaces of the extremities. It tends to be associated with elevated triglycerides.

=== Xanthoma planum ===
Xanthoma planum (ILDS D76.370), also known as plane xanthoma, is clinically characterized by bands or rectangular plates (macules) and plaques in the dermis spread diffusely over large areas of the body.

=== Palmar xanthoma ===
Palmar xanthoma is clinically characterized by yellowish plaques that involve the palms and flexural surfaces of the fingers. Palmar xanthomas are characterised by yellowish to orange, flat macules or slightly elevated plaques, often with a central white area which may be localised or generalised. They often arise in the skin folds, especially the palmar creases. They occur in hyperlipoproteinaemia type III and type IIA, and in association with biliary cirrhosis. The presence of palmar xanthomata, like the presence of tendinous xanthomata, is indicative of hypercholesterolaemia.

=== Tuberoeruptive xanthoma ===
Tuberoeruptive xanthoma (ILDS E78.210) is clinically characterized by red papules and nodules that appear inflamed and tend to coalesce. Tuberous xanthomata are considered similar, and within the same disease spectrum as eruptive xanthomata.

=== Other types ===
Other types of xanthoma identified in the Medical Dictionary include:

- Xanthoma diabeticorum: a type of eruptive xanthoma, often with severe diabetes.
- Xanthoma disseminatum: a rare xanthoma consisting of non-X histiocytes on flexural (folded) surfaces, associated with diabetes insipidus.
- Verrucous xanthoma, or histiocytosis Y: a papilloma of the oral mucosa and skin whereby the connective tissue under the epithelium contains histiocytes.

== See also ==
- Xanthelasma
- List of xanthoma variants associated with hyperlipoproteinemia subtypes
