= Janus (disambiguation) =

Janus is the two-faced Roman god of gates, doors, doorways, beginnings, and endings.

Janus may also refer to:

== Computing ==
- Janus, a codename used for Windows 2000 (DEC Alpha and Itanium 64-bit editions)
- Janus, a conflict simulation model, one of the world’s first near-real-time, player-interactive combat simulators
- Janus (concurrent constraint programming language)
- Janus (DRM), a Microsoft Digital Rights Management platform
- Janus (protocol), a file transfer protocol for use on bulletin board systems
- Janus (time-reversible computing programming language)
- Janus attack, an alternative name of a Man-in-the-middle attack
- JANUS clinical trial data repository, a standard supported by the U.S. Food and Drug Administration
- Janus Recognition Toolkit (JRTk), a general purpose speech recognition toolkit

== People ==
- Janus (given name)
- Janus (surname)
- Janus Prospero from the Resident Evil film series
- Janus of Cyprus (1375–1432), king of Cyprus from 1398 to 1432
- Janus I, Duke of Masovia
- J'anus, the claimed stage name of Janis McGavin, a performer on Balls of Steel Australia

== Astronomy ==
- Janus Patera, a shallow volcanic crater on Io, a moon of Jupiter
- Janus (moon), a moon of Saturn
- Janus (star), the name given to the hydrogen-helium faced white dwarf star ZTF J203349.8+322901.1

== Performing arts ==
=== Music ===
- Janus Records, a record label
- Janvs, a black metal band from Liguria, Italy
- Janus (musical project), a German darkwave musical project established 1995
- Janus (American band), hard rock band, established in the mid-1990s in Chicago, Illinois
- Janus (English band), progressive rock band established in 1969 in Krefeld, Germany
- Janus (album), the first full-length album released by Boyfriend

=== Film ===
- Janus Films, an American film distribution company
- Janus, the criminal organization in the James Bond movie GoldenEye
- The Janus Project, a taboo cloning project in the movie Judge Dredd

=== Other performing arts ===
- Janus (play), a 1955 Broadway romantic comedy
- Janus (TV series), an Australian drama television series

== Printed media ==
=== Comics ===
- Janus (comics), a list of characters
- Janus (Marvel Comics), Marvel Comics character
- Janus, DC Comics character known as Two-Face
- Janus, character in the novel Angels & Demons

=== Other printed media ===
- Janus (journal) (1896–1990), an academic journal on history of science and medicine published in Amsterdam
- Janus (science fiction magazine), a feminist science fiction magazine published from 1975-1980
- Janus: A Summing Up, a 1978 book by Arthur Koestler
- The Janus branch of the Cahill family in The 39 Clues
- Janus word or auto-antonym, a word with multiple meanings in which one is the reverse of another
- Janus, a French poetry magazine published in Paris by Elliott Stein from 1950 to 1961
- Janus (1971-2007), a British fetish magazine of erotic spanking and caning imagery.

== Games and gaming ==
- Janus Chess, a chess variant
- Janus Zeal, a character in the game Chrono Trigger

== Places ==
- Janus Island, an island of the Palmer Archipelago, Antarctica
- Mont Janus, a mountain near Mont Chaberton, France

== Science ==
- Janus (sawfly), a genus of stem sawflies in the family Cephidae
- Janus-faced molecule, used to describe a molecule whose effects on organisms can vary between beneficial and toxic
- Janus Experiments, a series of experiments on radio-sensitivity in mice and dogs
- Janus kinase, an intracellular signalling molecule; component of the JAK-STAT signal system
  - Janus kinase inhibitor, a medication that inhibits the activity of the Janus kinase enzymes
- Janus particle, an amphiphilic particle with a surface that is half hydrophilic half hydrophobic
- Janus TMD monolayers, a type of asymmetric transition-metal dichalcogenide monolayers
- Janus (spacecraft), a NASA mission to binary asteroids

== Transportation and vehicular ==
- Janus (1810 ship) (1810–1832), built in New York, U.S.
- HMS Janus, a name used by British naval ships
- Schempp-Hirth Janus, a German two-seater glider
- Yorkshire Engine Company Janus, a British diesel shunting locomotive
- Zündapp Janus, a bubble car model by Zündapp
- Janus Motorcycles, a motorcycle manufacturer based in Goshen, Indiana

== Other uses ==
- Janus Capital Group, an investment company based in Denver, Colorado
- Janus v. AFSCME, U.S. Supreme Court case (2018)
- Society of Janus, a San Francisco-based BDSM education and support group
- Janus, catalogue database of Cambridge University Library
- Janus, a sculpture by Clement Meadmore created for the Ruta de la Amistad in Mexico City

== See also ==
- Janis (disambiguation)
- Janice (disambiguation)
- Janusz
