= Jani =

Jani may refer to:

- Jani (given name)
- Jani (surname)
- Jani, Iran, a village
- Jāņi, a Latvian summer solstice festival
- Jani (film), a 2017 Kannada film
- Jani (letter), a Georgian letter

== See also ==
- Alternate forms for the name John
- Jaani (disambiguation)
- Janis (disambiguation)
- Janni, a given name and surname
- Jyani (disambiguation)
- Baba Jani (disambiguation)
- Jani-King, a cleaning service company
