= Janni =

Janni is both a given name and a surname. Notable people with the name include:

== Female ==
- Janni Arnth Jensen (born 1986), Danish football player
- Janni Bach (born 1966), Australian handball player
- Janni Howker, British author
- Janni Johansen (born 1976), Danish footballer
- Janni Jønsson (born 1968), Danish cricketer
- Janni Larsen (born 1963), Danish darts player
- Janni Olsson (born 1985), Swedish television presenter
- Janni Spies, Danish businesswoman
- Janni Thomsen (born 2000), Danish professional footballer

== Male ==
- Janni Lee Simner, American author
- Janni Serra (1998), German football player

== Surname ==
- Antonio Janni (1904-1987), Italian soccer player
- Guglielmo Janni (1892-1958), Italian painter
- Joseph Janni (1916-1994), British film producer
- Peter Janni known for Janni's chimney in Northport, Washington, United States

== See also ==
- Jann (Dungeons & Dragons), fictional characters
- Jannis
- Gianni
- Yanni (disambiguation)
- Jani (disambiguation)
- Jaani (disambiguation)
- Jannie
- Peripatopsis janni, species of velvet worm
- Alternate forms for the name John
