= Jannis =

Jannis is a given name. Notable people with the name include:

- Jannis Bäcker (born 1985), German bobsledder
- Jannis Kallinikos (born 1954), Greek academic
- Jannis Kounellis (born 1936), Greek artist
- Jannis Niewöhner (born 1992), German actor
- Jannis Schliesing (born 1992), German footballer
- Jannis Zamanduridis (born 1966), German sport wrestler
- Jannis Zotos (born 1958), German musician

== See also ==
- Janni
