= B-flat (jazz club) =

Jazz club in Berlin, Germany

Coordinates: 52.5274°N 13.4029°E

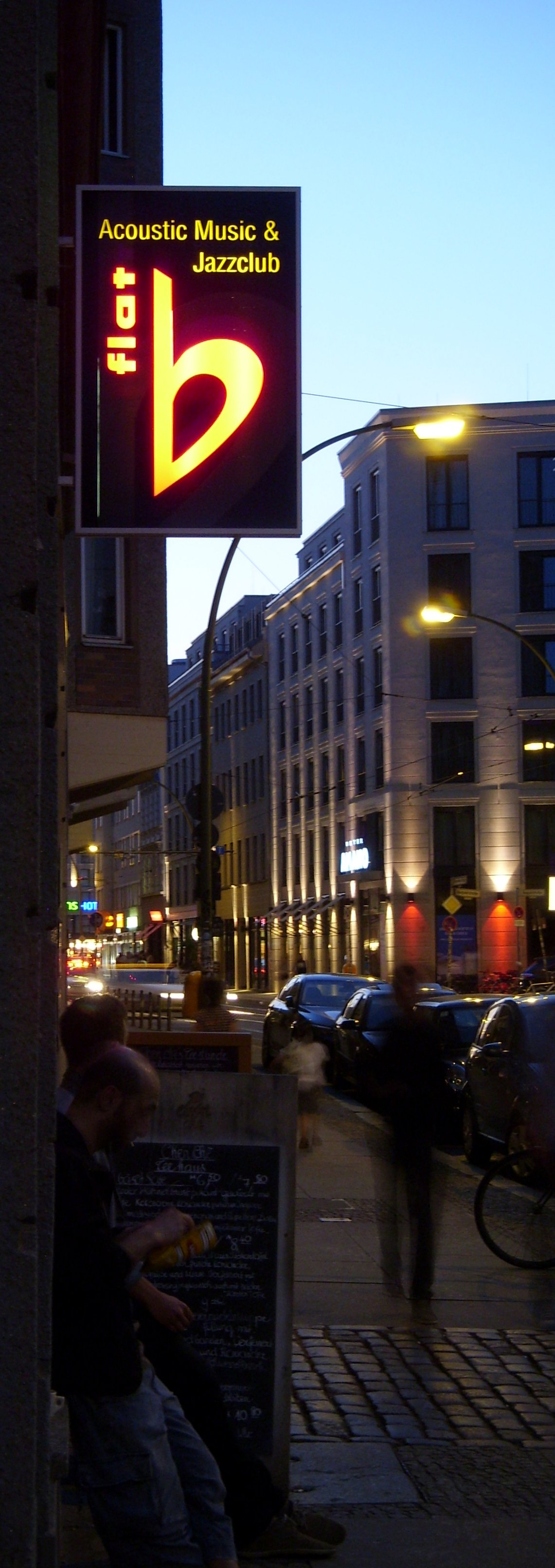

b-flat (full name: b-flat Acoustic Music & Jazzclub) is a jazz club in Berlin, Germany.

== Overview ==
The b-flat was launched in 1995 by musician brothers Jannis Zotos and Thanassis Zotos and the actor André Hennecke. From 1997 on Joerg Zieprig has been responsible for booking. The club is located near Hackescher Markt at Dircksenstr. 40, 10178 Berlin. It is open every night and has become an inherent part of the Berlin jazz scene. Local as well as internationally renowned musicians play jazz music of all different styles. On Wednesday nights there is a regular weekly jam session hosted by bass player Robin Draganic who is joined by varying guests.

Many well known musicians have played the b-flat over the years: Brad Mehldau, Joe Sample, Harry Connick Jr., Don Braden, Aki Takase, Alexander von Schlippenbach, Kurt Rosenwinkel, Judy Niemack, Mal Waldron, or Mikis Theodorakis.
