= Janis (surname) =

Janis or Janiš is a surname. Notable people with the surname include:

- Byron Janis (born 1928), American concert pianist (no relation to Conrad Janis)
- Conrad Janis (1928–2022), American actor and jazz musician (no relation to Byron Janis)
- Dorothy Janis (1912–2010), American silent film actress
- Elsie Janis (1889–1956), American musical theatre and vaudeville performer
- Irving Janis (1918–1990), social psychologist who pioneered the groupthink theory
- Jaroslav Janiš (born 1983), Czech auto racing driver
- Josef Antonín Janiš (1749–1821), Czech priest and apiculturist
- Linzie Janis (born 1979), American television journalist
- Sidney Janis, (1896–1989), American art dealer, collector, and writer

== See also ==
- Vivi Janiss (1911–1988), American actress
