= Cholesterol =

Sterol biosynthesized by all animal cells

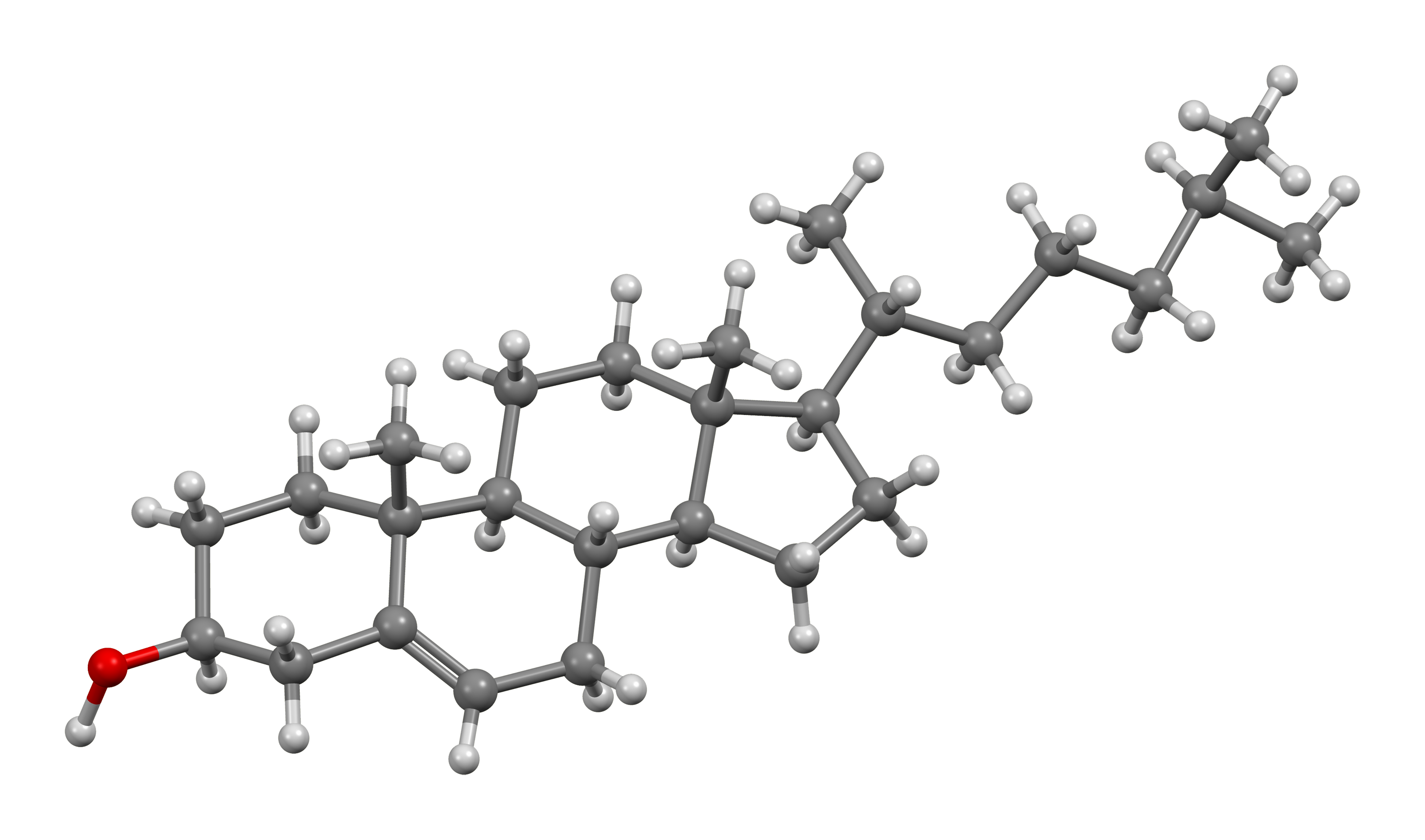

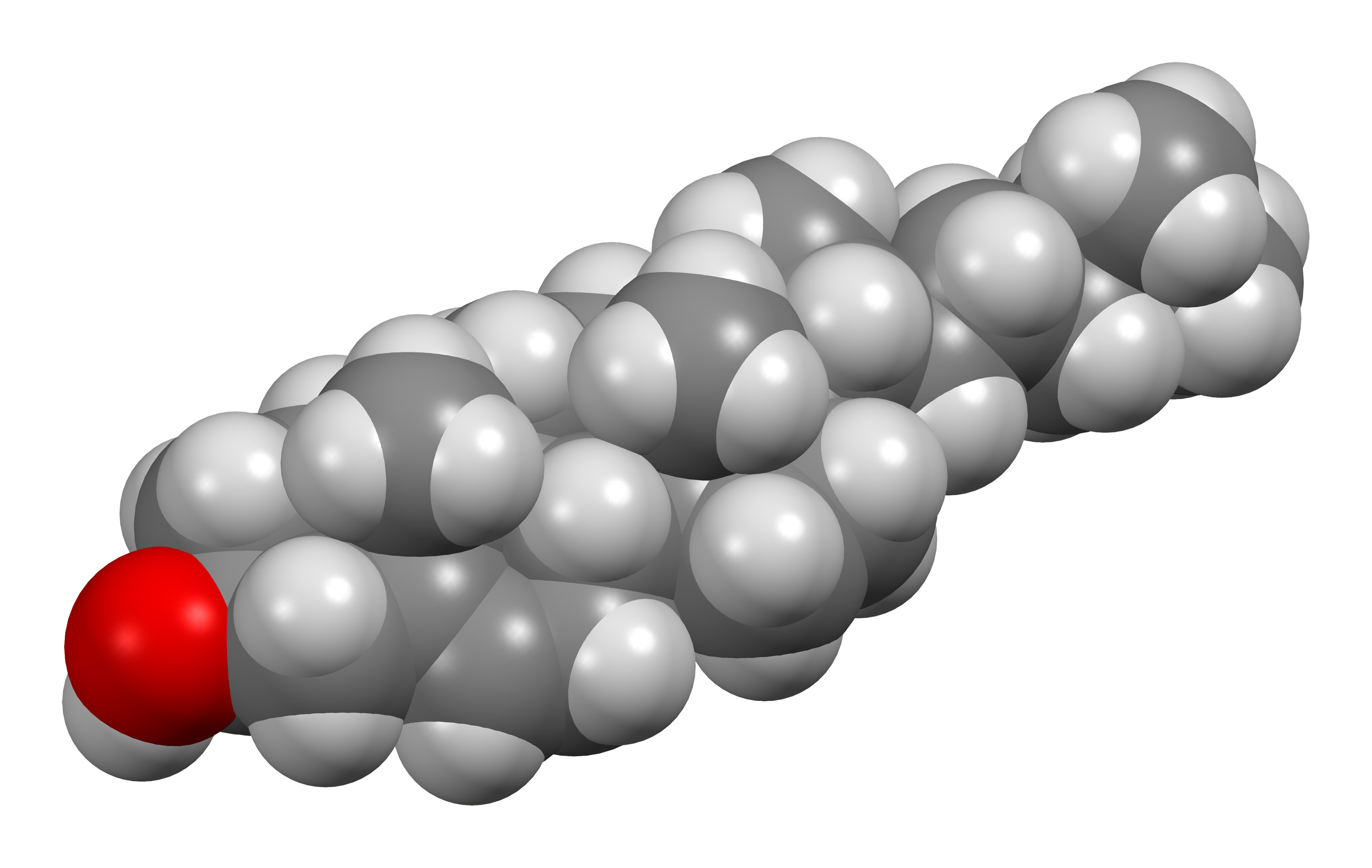

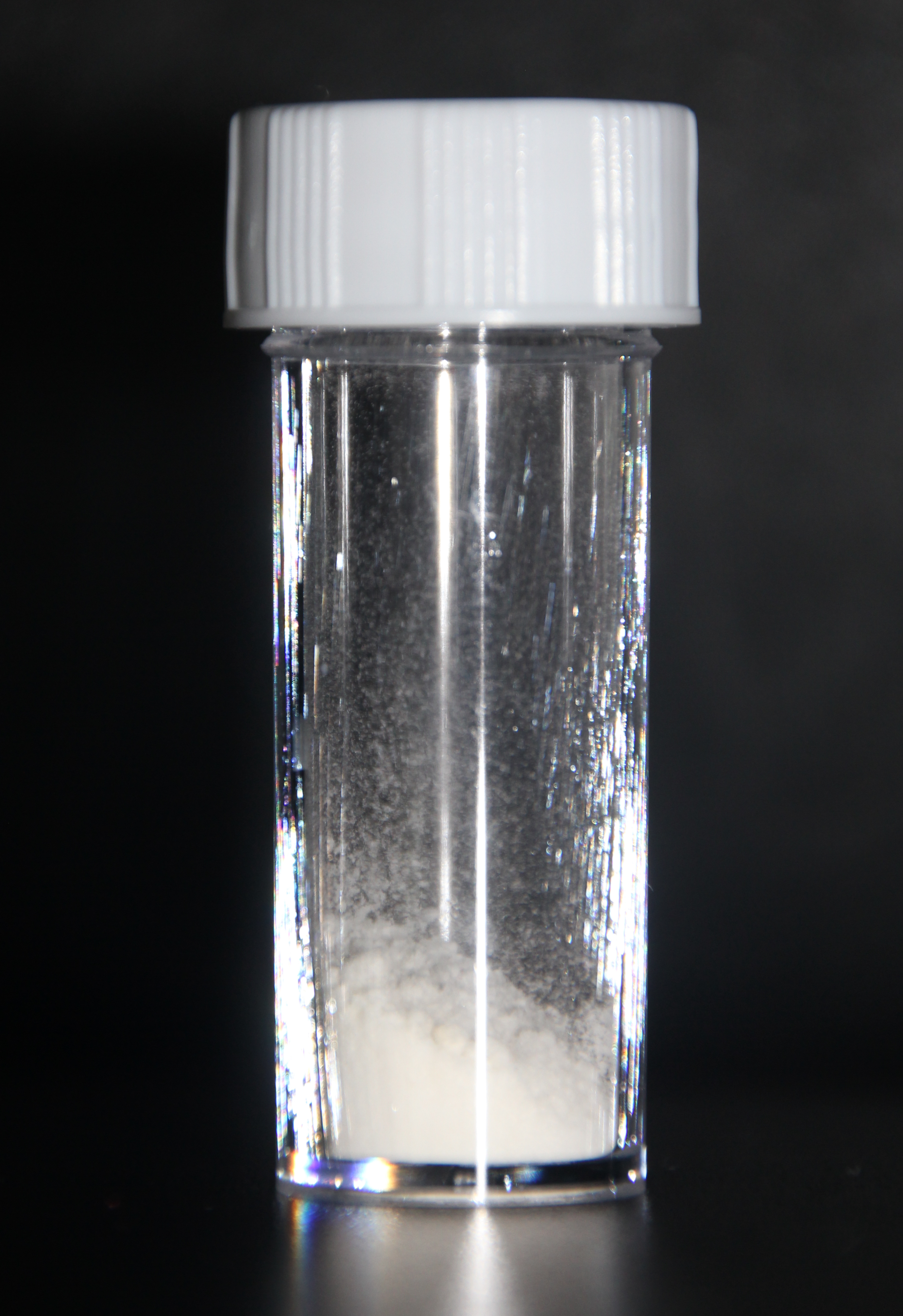

Names
- IUPAC name Cholest-5-en-3β-ol
- Systematic IUPAC name (1R,3aS,3bS,7S,9aR,9bS,11aR)-9a,11a-Dimethyl-1-[(2R)-6-methylheptan-2-yl]-2,3,3a,3b,4,6,7,8,9,9a,9b,10,11,11a-tetradecahydro-1H-cyclopenta[a]phenanthren-7-ol
- Other names Cholesterin, Cholesteryl alcohol

Identifiers
CAS Number	57-88-5
3D model (JSmol)	Interactive image
ChEBI	CHEBI:16113
ChEMBL	ChEMBL112570
ChemSpider	5775
ECHA InfoCard	100.000.321
IUPHAR/BPS	2718
KEGG	D00040
PubChem CID	5997
UNII	97C5T2UQ7J
CompTox Dashboard (EPA)	DTXSID3022401
- InChI: InChI=1S/C27H46O/c1-18(2)7-6-8-19(3)23-11-12-24-22-10-9-20-17-21(28)13-15-26(20,4)25(22)14-16-27(23,24)5/h9,18-19,21-25,28H,6-8,10-17H2,1-5H3/t19-,21+,22+,23-,24+,25+,26+,27-/m1/s1 Key: HVYWMOMLDIMFJA-DPAQBDIFSA-N; InChI=1/C27H46O/c1-18(2)7-6-8-19(3)23-11-12-24-22-10-9-20-17-21(28)13-15-26(20,4)25(22)14-16-27(23,24)5/h9,18-19,21-25,28H,6-8,10-17H2,1-5H3/t19-,21+,22+,23-,24+,25+,26+,27-/m1/s1 Key: HVYWMOMLDIMFJA-DPAQBDIFBB
- SMILES: C[C@H](CCCC(C)C)[C@H]1CC[C@@H]2[C@@]1(CC[C@H]3[C@H]2CC=C4[C@@]3(CC[C@@H](C4)O)C)C

Properties
Chemical formula	C_{27}H_{46}O
Molar mass	386.664 g·mol^{−1}
Appearance	white crystalline powder
Density	1.052 g/cm^{3}
Melting point	148 to 150 °C (298 to 302 °F; 421 to 423 K)
Boiling point	360 °C (680 °F; 633 K) (decomposes)
Solubility in water	0.095 mg/L (30 °C)
Solubility	soluble in acetone, benzene, chloroform, ethanol, ether, hexane, isopropyl myristate, methanol
Magnetic susceptibility (χ)	−284.2·10^{−6} cm^{3}/mol

Hazards
Flash point	209.3 ±12.4 °C
- Except where otherwise noted, data are given for materials in their standard state (at 25 °C [77 °F], 100 kPa). verify (what is ?) Infobox references

Cholesterol is the principal sterol of all animals, distributed in body tissues, especially the brain and spinal cord, and in animal fats and oils.

Cholesterol is biosynthesized by all animal cells and is an essential structural and signaling component of animal cell membranes. In vertebrates, hepatic cells typically produce the greatest amounts of it. In the brain, astrocytes produce cholesterol and transport it to neurons. It is absent among prokaryotes (bacteria and archaea), although there are some exceptions, such as Mycoplasma, which require cholesterol for growth. Cholesterol also serves as a precursor for the biosynthesis of steroid hormones, bile acid, and vitamin D.

Elevated levels of cholesterol in the blood, especially when bound to low-density lipoprotein (LDL, often referred to as "bad cholesterol"), may increase the risk of cardiovascular disease.

François Poulletier de la Salle first identified cholesterol in solid form in gallstones in 1769. In 1815, chemist Michel Eugène Chevreul named the compound "cholesterine".

== Etymology ==
The word cholesterol comes from Ancient Greek χολή (kholḗ , 'bile') and στερεός (stereos, 'solid'), followed by the chemical suffix -ol for an alcohol.

== Physiology ==
Cholesterol is essential for all animal life. While most cells are capable of synthesizing it, the majority of cholesterol is ingested or synthesized by hepatocytes and transported in the blood to peripheral cells. The levels of cholesterol in peripheral tissues are dictated by a balance of uptake and export. Under normal conditions, brain cholesterol is separate from peripheral cholesterol, i.e., the dietary and hepatic cholesterol do not cross the blood brain barrier. Rather, astrocytes produce and distribute cholesterol in the brain.

De novo synthesis, both in astrocytes and hepatocytes, occurs by a complex 37-step process. This begins with the mevalonate or HMG-CoA reductase pathway, the target of statin drugs, which encompasses the first 18 steps. This is followed by 19 additional steps to convert the resulting lanosterol into cholesterol. A human male weighing 68 kg (150 lb) normally synthesizes about 1 gram (1,000 mg) of cholesterol per day, and his body contains about 35 g, mostly contained within the cell membranes.

Typical daily cholesterol dietary intake for a man in the United States is 307 mg. Most ingested cholesterol is esterified, which causes it to be poorly absorbed by the gut. The body also compensates for absorption of ingested cholesterol by reducing its own cholesterol synthesis. For these reasons, cholesterol in food, seven to ten hours after ingestion, has little, if any effect on concentrations of cholesterol in the blood. Conversely, in rats, blood cholesterol is inversely correlated with cholesterol consumption: the more cholesterol a rat eats the lower the blood cholesterol. During the first seven hours after ingestion of cholesterol, as absorbed fats are being distributed around the body within extracellular water by the various lipoproteins (which transport all fats in the water outside cells), the concentrations increase.

Plants make cholesterol in very small amounts. In larger quantities they produce phytosterols, chemically similar substances that compete with cholesterol for reabsorption in the intestinal tract, thus potentially reducing cholesterol reabsorption. When intestinal lining cells absorb phytosterols, in place of cholesterol, they usually excrete the phytosterol molecules back into the GI tract, an important protective mechanism. The intake of naturally occurring phytosterols, which encompass plant sterols and stanols, ranges between ≈200‍–‍300 mg/day depending on eating habits. Specially designed vegetarian experimental diets have been produced yielding upwards of 700 mg/day.

=== Function ===
==== Membranes ====
Cholesterol is present in varying degrees in all animal cell membranes but is absent in prokaryotes. It is required to build and maintain membranes and modulates membrane fluidity over the range of physiological temperatures. The hydroxyl group of each cholesterol molecule interacts with water molecules surrounding the membrane, as do the polar heads of the membrane phospholipids and sphingolipids, while the bulky steroid and the hydrocarbon chain are embedded in the membrane, alongside the nonpolar fatty-acid chain of the other lipids. Through the interaction with the phospholipid fatty-acid chains, cholesterol increases membrane packing, which both alters membrane fluidity and maintains membrane integrity so that animal cells do not need to build cell walls (like plants and most bacteria). The membrane remains stable and durable without being rigid, allowing animal cells to change shape and animals to move.

The structure of the tetracyclic ring of cholesterol contributes to the fluidity of the cell membrane, as the molecule is in a trans conformation, making all but the side chain of cholesterol rigid and planar. In this structural role, cholesterol also reduces the permeability of the plasma membrane to neutral solutes, hydrogen ions, and sodium ions.

==== Substrate presentation ====
Cholesterol regulates the biological process of substrate presentation and the enzymes that use substrate presentation as a mechanism of their activation. Phospholipase D2 (PLD2) is a well-defined example of an enzyme activated by substrate presentation. The enzyme is palmitoylated causing the enzyme to traffic to cholesterol dependent lipid domains sometimes called "lipid rafts". The substrate of phospholipase D is phosphatidylcholine (PC) which is unsaturated and is of low abundance in lipid rafts. PC localizes to the disordered region of the cell along with the polyunsaturated lipid phosphatidylinositol 4,5-bisphosphate (PIP_{2}). PLD2 has a PIP_{2} binding domain. When PIP_{2} concentration in the membrane increases, PLD2 leaves the cholesterol-dependent domains and binds to PIP_{2} where it then gains access to its substrate PC and commences catalysis based on substrate presentation.

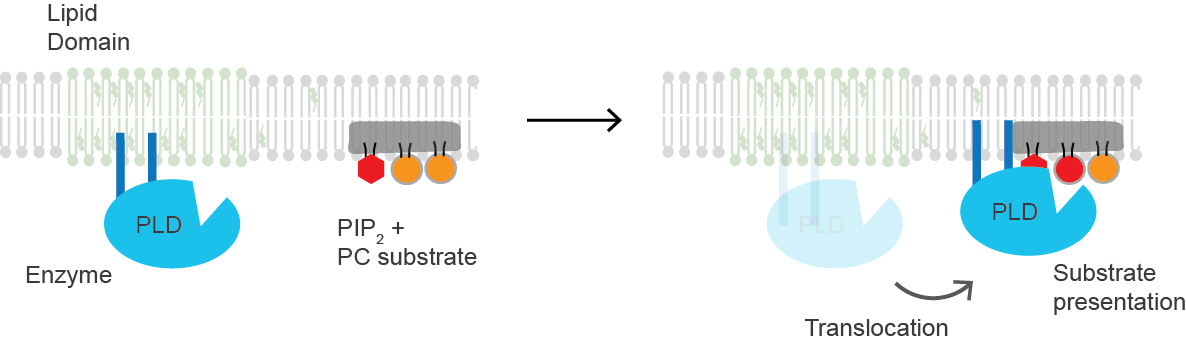
Substrate presentation; PLD (blue oval) is sequestered into cholesterol-dependent lipid domains (green lipids) by palmitoylation. PLD also binds PIP_{2}(red hexagon) domains (grey shading) located in the disordered region of the cell with phosphatidylcholine (PC). When cholesterol decreases or PIP_{2} increases in the cell, PLD translocates to PIP_{2} where it is exposed to and hydrolizes PC to phosphatidic acid (red spherical lipid).

==== Signaling ====
Cholesterol is implicated in cell signaling processes, assisting in the formation of lipid rafts in the plasma membrane, which brings receptor proteins in close proximity with high concentrations of second messenger molecules. In multiple layers, cholesterol and phospholipids (both electrical insulators) can facilitate speed of transmission of electrical impulses along nerve tissue. For many neuron fibers, a myelin sheath, rich in cholesterol since it is derived from compacted layers of Schwann cell or oligodendrocyte membranes, provides insulation for more efficient conduction of impulses. Demyelination (loss of myelin) is believed to be part of the basis for multiple sclerosis.

Cholesterol binds to and affects the gating of a number of ion channels such as the nicotinic acetylcholine receptor, GABA_{A} receptor, and the inward-rectifier potassium channel. Cholesterol activates the estrogen-related receptor alpha (ERRα) and may be the endogenous ligand for the receptor. The constitutively active nature of the receptor may be explained by the fact that cholesterol is ubiquitous in the body. Inhibition of ERRα signaling by reduction of cholesterol production has been identified as a key mediator of the effects of statins and bisphosphonates on bone, muscle, and macrophages. On the basis of these findings, it has been suggested that the ERRα should be de-orphanized and classified as a receptor for cholesterol.

==== As a chemical precursor ====
Within cells, cholesterol is a precursor molecule for several biochemical pathways. For example, it is the precursor molecule for the synthesis of vitamin D in the calcium metabolism and all steroid hormones, including the adrenal gland hormones cortisol and aldosterone, as well as the sex hormones progesterone, estrogens, and testosterone, and their derivatives.

==== Epidermis ====
The stratum corneum is the outermost layer of the epidermis. It is composed of terminally differentiated and enucleated corneocytes that reside within a lipid matrix, like "bricks and mortar." Together with ceramides and free fatty acids, cholesterol forms the lipid mortar, a water-impermeable barrier that prevents evaporative water loss. As a rule of thumb, the epidermal lipid matrix is composed of an equimolar mixture of ceramides (≈50% by weight), cholesterol (≈25% by weight), and free fatty acids (≈15% by weight), with smaller quantities of other lipids also present. Cholesterol sulfate reaches its highest concentration in the granular layer of the epidermis. Steroid sulfate sulfatase then decreases its concentration in the stratum corneum, the outermost layer of the epidermis. The relative abundance of cholesterol sulfate in the epidermis varies across different body sites with the heel of the foot having the lowest concentration.

=== Metabolism ===
Cholesterol is recycled in the body. The liver excretes cholesterol into biliary fluids, which are then stored in the gallbladder from where they are excreted in a non-esterified form (via bile) into the digestive tract. Typically, about 50% of the excreted cholesterol is reabsorbed by the small intestine back into the bloodstream.

== Biosynthesis and regulation ==
=== Biosynthesis ===
Almost all animal tissues synthesize cholesterol from acetyl-CoA. All animal cells (with some exceptions within the invertebrates) manufacture cholesterol, for both membrane structure and other uses, with relative production rates varying by cell type and organ function. About 80% of total daily cholesterol production occurs in the liver and the intestines; other sites of higher synthesis rates include the brain, the adrenal glands, and the reproductive organs.

Synthesis within the body starts with the mevalonate pathway where two molecules of acetyl-CoA condense to form acetoacetyl-CoA. This is followed by a second condensation between acetyl-CoA and acetoacetyl-CoA to form 3-hydroxy-3-methylglutaryl CoA (HMG-CoA).

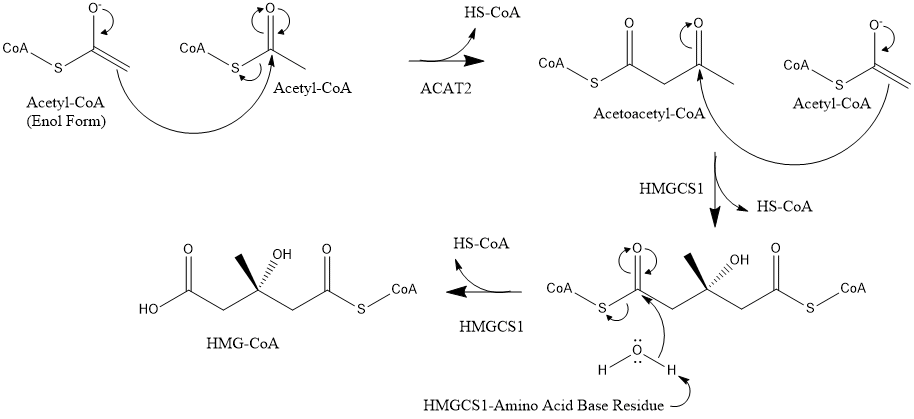

This molecule is then reduced to mevalonate by the enzyme HMG-CoA reductase. Production of mevalonate is the rate-limiting and irreversible step in cholesterol synthesis and is the site of action for statins (a class of cholesterol-lowering drugs).

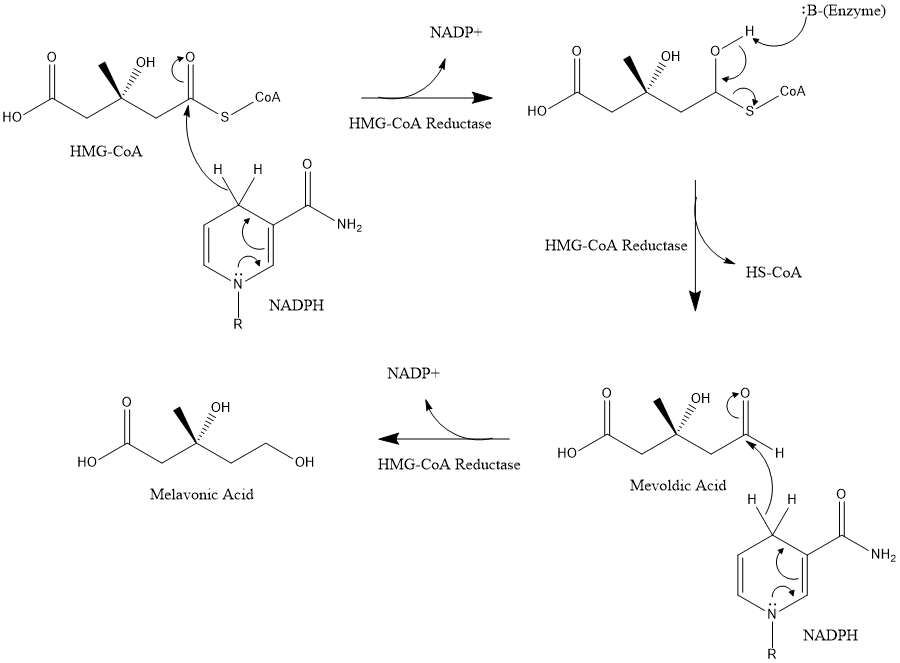

Mevalonate is finally converted to isopentenyl pyrophosphate (IPP) through two phosphorylation steps and one decarboxylation step that requires ATP.

The conversion of Melavonate to IPP and DMAPP

Three molecules of isopentenyl pyrophosphate condense to form farnesyl pyrophosphate through the action of dimethylallyltranstransferase.

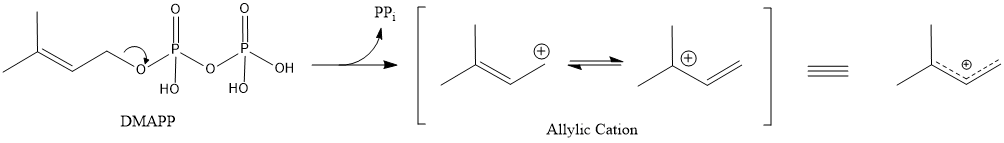

Two molecules of farnesyl pyrophosphate then condense to form squalene by the action of squalene synthase in the endoplasmic reticulum.

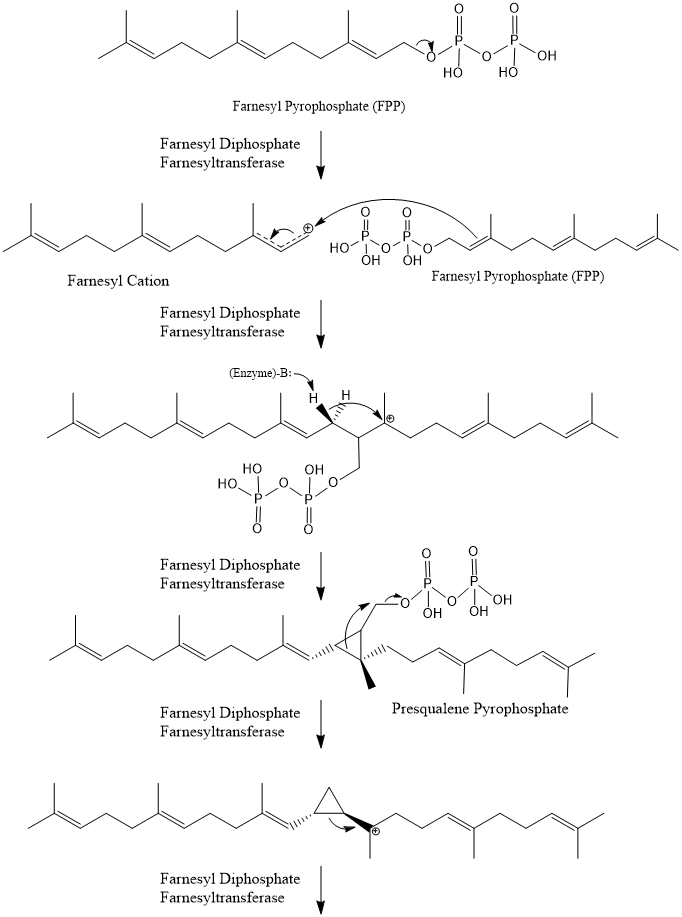

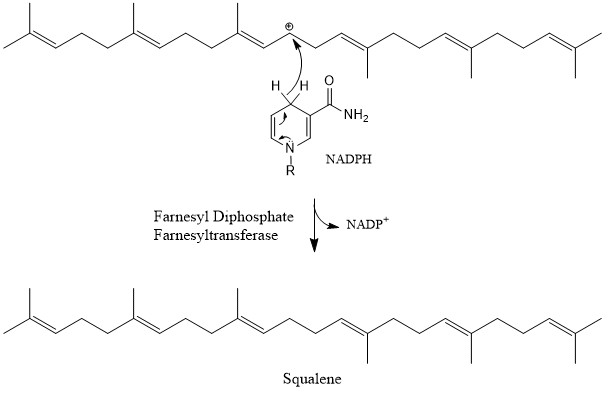

Squalene is epoxidated by squalene monooxygenase to oxidosqualene. Oxidosqualene cyclase then cyclizes oxidosqualene to form lanosterol.

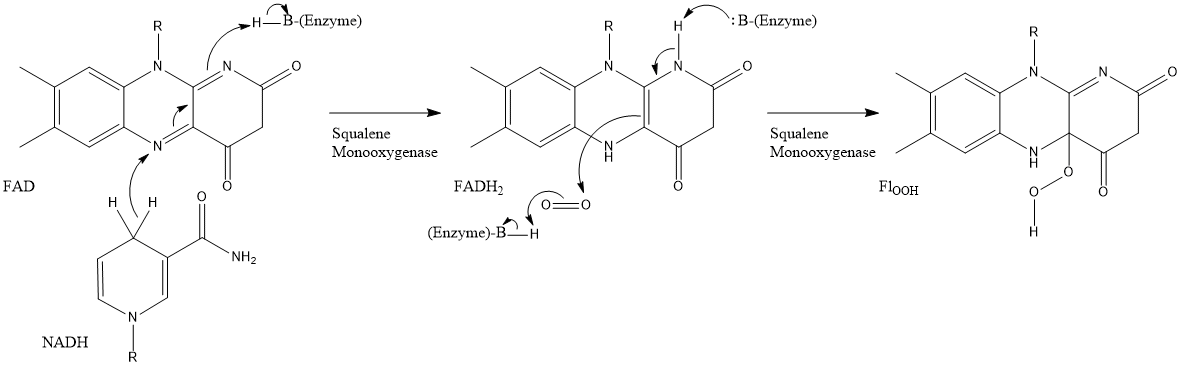

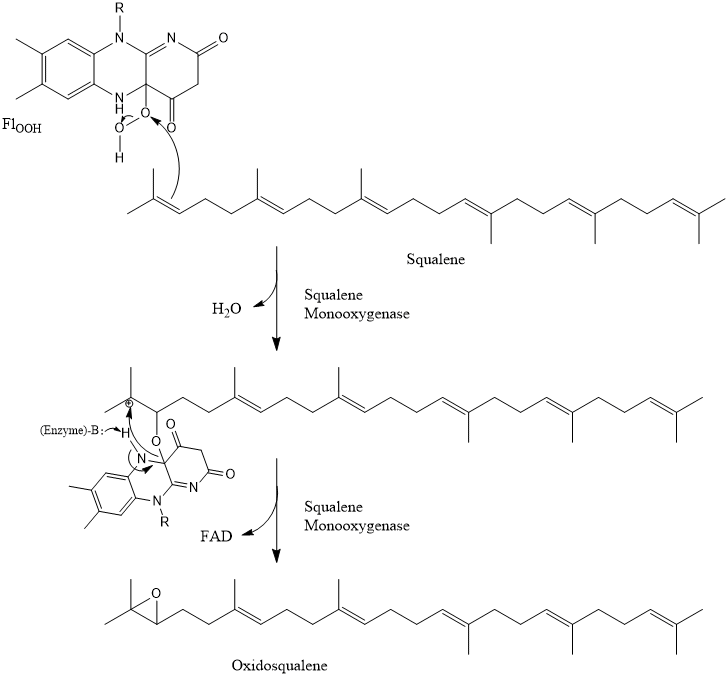

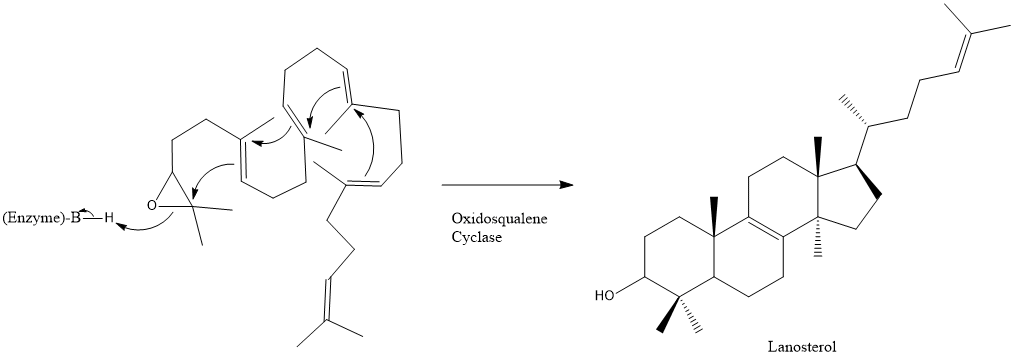

Finally, lanosterol is converted to cholesterol via either of two pathways, the Bloch pathway, or the Kandutsch-Russell pathway. The final 19 steps to cholesterol contain NADPH and oxygen to help oxidize methyl groups for the removal of carbons, mutases to move alkene groups, and NADH to help reduce ketones.

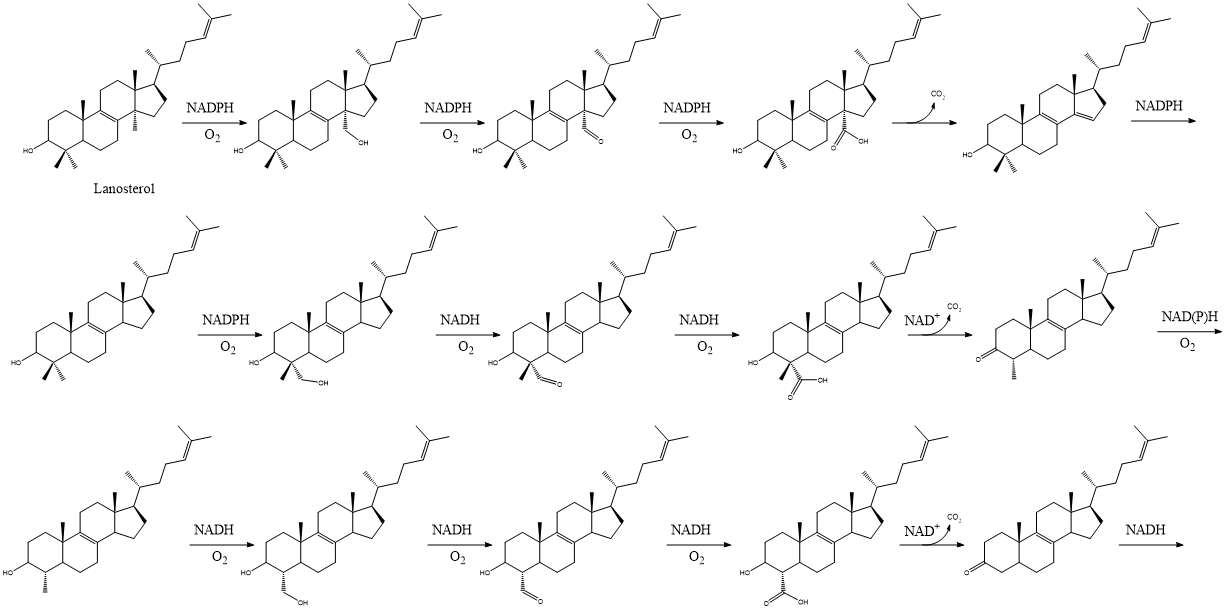

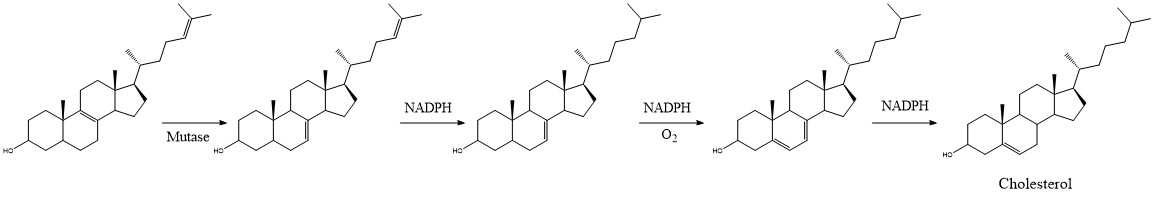

Konrad Bloch and Feodor Lynen shared the Nobel Prize in Physiology or Medicine in 1964 for their discoveries concerning some of the mechanisms and methods of regulation of cholesterol and fatty acid metabolism.

=== Regulation of cholesterol synthesis ===
Biosynthesis of cholesterol is directly regulated by the cholesterol levels present, though the homeostatic mechanisms involved are only partly understood. A higher intake of food leads to a net decrease in endogenous production, whereas a lower intake of food has the opposite effect. The main regulatory mechanism is the sensing of intracellular cholesterol in the endoplasmic reticulum by the protein SREBP (sterol regulatory element-binding protein 1 and 2). In the presence of cholesterol, SREBP is bound to two other proteins: SCAP (SREBP cleavage-activating protein) and INSIG-1. When cholesterol levels fall, INSIG-1 dissociates from the SREBP-SCAP complex, which allows the complex to migrate to the Golgi apparatus. Here SREBP is cleaved by S1P and S2P (site-1 protease and site-2 protease), two enzymes that are activated by SCAP when cholesterol levels are low.

The cleaved SREBP then migrates to the nucleus and acts as a transcription factor to bind to the sterol regulatory element (SRE), which stimulates the transcription of many genes. Among these are the low-density lipoprotein (LDL) receptor and HMG-CoA reductase. The LDL receptor scavenges circulating LDL from the bloodstream, whereas HMG-CoA reductase leads to an increase in endogenous production of cholesterol. A large part of this signaling pathway was clarified by Dr. Michael S. Brown and Dr. Joseph L. Goldstein in the 1970s. In 1985, they received the Nobel Prize in Physiology or Medicine for their work. Their subsequent work shows how the SREBP pathway regulates the expression of many genes that control lipid formation and metabolism and body fuel allocation.

Cholesterol synthesis can be turned off when cholesterol levels are high. HMG-CoA reductase contains both a cytosolic domain (responsible for its catalytic function) and a membrane domain which senses signals for its degradation. Increasing concentrations of cholesterol (and other sterols) cause a change in this domain's oligomerization state, making it more susceptible to destruction by the proteasome. This enzyme's activity can also be reduced by phosphorylation by an AMP-activated protein kinase. Because this kinase is activated by AMP, which is produced when ATP is hydrolyzed, it follows that cholesterol synthesis is halted when ATP levels are low.

=== Plasma transport and regulation of absorption ===
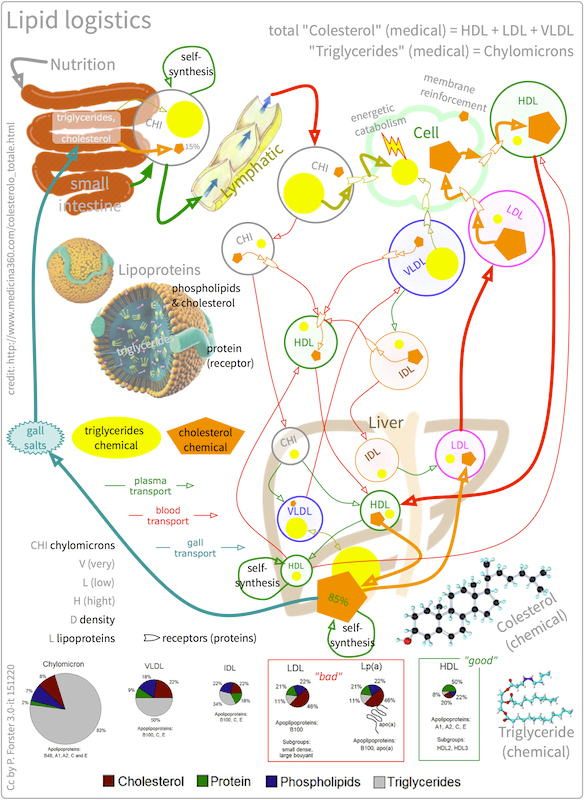
Lipid logistics: transport of triglycerides and cholesterol in organisms in form of lipoproteins as chylomicrons, VLDL, LDL, IDL, HDL.

As an isolated molecule, cholesterol is only minimally soluble in water, or hydrophilic. Because of this, it dissolves in blood at exceedingly small concentrations. To be transported effectively, cholesterol is instead packaged within lipoproteins, complex discoidal particles with exterior amphiphilic proteins and lipids, whose outward-facing surfaces are water-soluble and inward-facing surfaces are lipid-soluble. This allows it to travel through the blood via emulsification. Unbound cholesterol, also being amphiphilic, is transported in the monolayer surface of the lipoprotein particle along with phospholipids and proteins. Cholesterol esters bound to fatty acid, on the other hand, are transported within the fatty hydrophobic core of the lipoprotein, along with triglyceride.

There are several types of lipoproteins in the blood. In order of increasing density, they are chylomicrons, very-low-density lipoprotein (VLDL), intermediate-density lipoprotein (IDL), low-density lipoprotein (LDL), and high-density lipoprotein (HDL). Lower protein/lipid ratios make for less dense lipoproteins. Cholesterol within different lipoproteins is identical, although some are carried as their native "free" alcohol form (the cholesterol-OH group facing the water surrounding the particles), while others as fatty acyl esters (known also as cholesterol esters) within the particles.

Lipoprotein particles are organized by complex apolipoproteins, typically between 80 and 100 different proteins per particle, which can be recognized and bound by specific receptors on cell membranes, directing their lipid payload into specific cells and tissues currently ingesting these fat transport particles. These surface receptors serve as unique molecular signatures, which then help determine fat distribution delivery throughout the body.

Chylomicrons, the least dense cholesterol transport particles, contain apolipoprotein B-48, apolipoprotein C, and apolipoprotein E (the principal cholesterol carrier in the brain) in their shells. Chylomicrons carry fats from the intestine to muscle and other tissues in need of fatty acids for energy or fat production. Unused cholesterol remains in more cholesterol-rich chylomicron remnants and is taken up from here to the bloodstream by the liver.

VLDL particles are produced by the liver from triacylglycerol and cholesterol not used in the synthesis of bile acids. These particles contain apolipoprotein B100 and apolipoprotein E in their shells and can be degraded by lipoprotein lipase on the artery wall to IDL. This arterial wall cleavage allows absorption of triacylglycerol and increases the concentration of circulating cholesterol. IDL particles are then consumed in two processes: half is metabolized by HTGL and taken up by the LDL receptor on the liver cell surfaces, while the other half continues to lose triacylglycerols in the bloodstream until they become cholesterol-laden LDL particles.

LDL particles are the major blood cholesterol carriers. Each one contains approximately 1,500 molecules of cholesterol ester. LDL particle shells contain just one molecule of apolipoprotein B100, recognized by LDL receptors in peripheral tissues. Upon binding of apolipoprotein B100, many LDL receptors concentrate in clathrin-coated pits. Both LDL and its receptor form vesicles within a cell via endocytosis. These vesicles then fuse with a lysosome, where the lysosomal acid lipase enzyme hydrolyzes the cholesterol esters. The cholesterol can then be used for membrane biosynthesis or esterified and stored within the cell, so as to not interfere with the cell membranes.

LDL receptors are used up during cholesterol absorption, and its synthesis is regulated by SREBP, the same protein that controls the synthesis of cholesterol de novo, according to its presence inside the cell. A cell with abundant cholesterol will have its LDL receptor synthesis blocked, to prevent new cholesterol in LDL particles from being taken up. Conversely, LDL receptor synthesis proceeds when a cell is deficient in cholesterol.

When this process becomes unregulated, LDL particles without receptors begin to appear in the blood. These LDL particles are oxidized and taken up by macrophages, which become engorged and form foam cells. These foam cells often become trapped in the walls of blood vessels and contribute to atherosclerotic plaque formation. Differences in cholesterol homeostasis affect the development of early atherosclerosis (carotid intima-media thickness). These plaques are the main causes of heart attacks, strokes, and other serious medical problems, leading to the association of so-called LDL cholesterol (actually a lipoprotein) with the term "bad" cholesterol.

HDL particles are thought to transport cholesterol back to the liver, either for excretion or for other tissues that synthesize hormones, in a process known as reverse cholesterol transport (RCT). Large numbers of HDL particles correlates with better health outcomes, whereas low numbers of HDL particles is associated with atheromatous disease progression in the arteries.

=== Metabolism, recycling and excretion ===
Cholesterol is susceptible to oxidation and easily forms oxygenated derivatives called oxysterols. These can be formed by three different mechanisms: autoxidation, secondary oxidation to lipid peroxidation, and cholesterol-metabolizing enzyme oxidation. A great interest in oxysterols arose when they were shown to exert inhibitory actions on cholesterol biosynthesis. This finding became known as the "oxysterol hypothesis". Additional roles for oxysterols in human physiology include their participation in bile acid biosynthesis, function as transport forms of cholesterol, and regulation of gene transcription.

In biochemical experiments, radiolabelled forms of cholesterol, such as tritiated-cholesterol, are used. These derivatives undergo degradation upon storage, and it is essential to purify cholesterol prior to use. Cholesterol can be purified using small Sephadex LH-20 columns.

Cholesterol is oxidized by the liver into a variety of bile acids. These, in turn, are conjugated with glycine, taurine, glucuronic acid, or sulfate. A mixture of conjugated and nonconjugated bile acids, along with cholesterol itself, is excreted from the liver into the bile. Approximately 95% of the bile acids are reabsorbed from the intestines, and the remainder are lost in the feces. The excretion and reabsorption of bile acids forms the basis of the enterohepatic circulation, which is essential for the digestion and absorption of dietary fats. Under certain circumstances, when more concentrated, as in the gallbladder, cholesterol crystallises and is the major constituent of most gallstones (lecithin and bilirubin gallstones also occur, but less frequently). Every day, up to one gram of cholesterol enters the colon. This cholesterol originates from the diet, bile, and desquamated intestinal cells, and it can be metabolized by the colonic bacteria. Cholesterol is converted mainly into coprostanol, a nonabsorbable sterol that is excreted in the feces.

Although cholesterol is a steroid generally associated with mammals, the human pathogen Mycobacterium tuberculosis is able to completely degrade this molecule and contains a large number of genes that are regulated by its presence. Many of these cholesterol-regulated genes are homologues of fatty acid β-oxidation genes, which have evolved in such a way as to bind large steroid substrates like cholesterol.

== Dietary sources ==
Animal fats are complex mixtures of triglycerides, with lesser amounts of both the phospholipids and cholesterol molecules from which all animal (and human) cell membranes are constructed. Since all animal cells manufacture cholesterol, all animal-based foods contain cholesterol in varying amounts. Major dietary sources of cholesterol include red meat, egg yolks and whole eggs, liver, kidney, giblets, fish oil, shellfish, and butter. Human breast milk also contains significant quantities of cholesterol.

Plant cells synthesize cholesterol as a precursor for other compounds, such as phytosterols and steroidal glycoalkaloids, with cholesterol remaining in plant foods only in minor amounts or absent. Some plant foods, such as avocado, flax seeds and peanuts, contain phytosterols, which compete with cholesterol for absorption in the intestines and reduce the absorption of both dietary and bile cholesterol. A typical diet contributes in the order of 0.2 grams of phytosterols, not enough to have a significant impact on blocking cholesterol absorption. The intake of phytosterols can be supplemented through the use of phytosterol-containing functional foods or dietary supplements that are recognized as having potential to reduce levels of LDL-cholesterol.

=== Medical guidelines and recommendations ===
In 2015, the scientific advisory panel of U.S. Department of Health and Human Services and U.S. Department of Agriculture for the 2015 iteration of the Dietary Guidelines for Americans dropped the previously recommended limit of consumption of dietary cholesterol to 300 mg per day with a new recommendation to "eat as little dietary cholesterol as possible", thereby acknowledging an association between a diet low in cholesterol and reduced risk of cardiovascular disease.

A 2013 report by the American Heart Association and the American College of Cardiology recommended focusing on healthy dietary patterns rather than specific cholesterol limits, as they are hard for clinicians and consumers to implement. They recommend the DASH and Mediterranean diet, both of which are low in cholesterol. A 2017 review by the American Heart Association recommends switching saturated fats for polyunsaturated fats to reduce cardiovascular disease risk.

Some supplemental guidelines have recommended doses of phytosterols in the order of 1.6‍–‍3.0 grams per day (Health Canada, EFSA, ATP III, FDA). A meta-analysis demonstrated a 12% reduction in LDL-cholesterol at a mean dose of 2.1 grams per day. The benefits of a diet supplemented with phytosterols have also been questioned.

== Clinical significance ==
=== Hypercholesterolemia ===
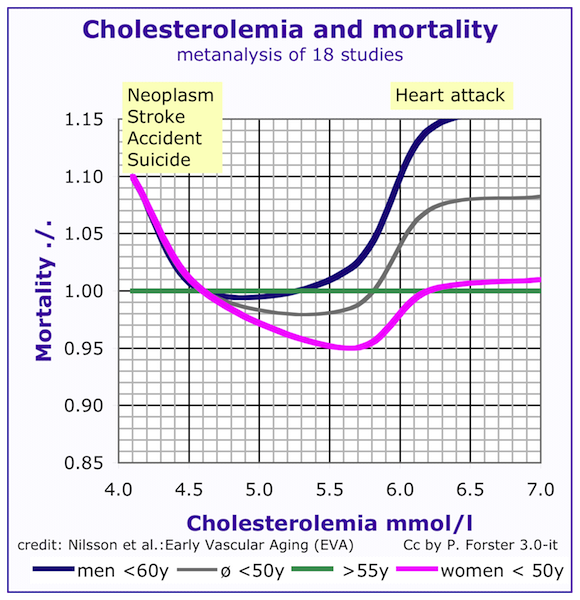
Cholesterolemia and mortality for men and women <50 years and >60 years

According to the lipid hypothesis, elevated levels of cholesterol in the blood lead to atherosclerosis, which may increase the risk of heart attack, stroke, and peripheral artery disease. Since higher blood LDL – especially higher LDL concentrations and smaller LDL particle size – contributes to this process more than the cholesterol content of the HDL particles, LDL particles are often termed "bad cholesterol". High concentrations of functional HDL, which can remove cholesterol from cells and atheromas, offer protection and are commonly referred to as "good cholesterol". These balances are mostly genetically determined but can be changed by body composition, medications, diet, and other factors. A 2007 study demonstrated that blood total cholesterol levels have an exponential effect on cardiovascular and total mortality, with the association more pronounced in younger subjects. Because cardiovascular disease is relatively rare in the younger population, the impact of high cholesterol on health is larger in older people.

Elevated levels of the lipoprotein fractions, LDL, IDL and VLDL, rather than the total cholesterol level, correlate with the extent and progress of atherosclerosis. Conversely, the total cholesterol can be within normal limits, yet be made up primarily of small LDL and small HDL particles, under which conditions atheroma growth rates are high. A post hoc analysis of the IDEAL and the EPIC prospective studies found an association between high levels of HDL cholesterol (adjusted for apolipoprotein A-I and apolipoprotein B) and increased risk of cardiovascular disease, casting doubt on the cardioprotective role of "good cholesterol".

About one in 250 individuals has a genetic mutation for the LDL cholesterol receptor that causes them to have familial hypercholesterolemia. Inherited high cholesterol can also include genetic mutations in the PCSK9 gene and the gene for apolipoprotein B.

Elevated cholesterol levels are treatable by a diet that reduces or eliminates saturated fat, and trans fats, often followed by one of various hypolipidemic agents, such as statins, fibrates, cholesterol absorption inhibitors, monoclonal antibody therapy (PCSK9 inhibitors), nicotinic acid derivatives or bile acid sequestrants. There are several international guidelines on the treatment of hypercholesterolemia.

Human trials using HMG-CoA reductase inhibitors, commonly known as statins, have repeatedly confirmed that changing lipoprotein transport patterns from unhealthy to healthier patterns significantly lowers cardiovascular disease event rates, even for people with cholesterol values currently considered low for adults. Studies have shown that reducing LDL cholesterol levels by about 38.7 mg/dL with the use of statins can reduce cardiovascular disease and stroke risk by about 21%. Studies have also found that statins reduce atheroma progression. As a result, people with a history of cardiovascular disease may derive benefit from statins irrespective of their cholesterol levels (total cholesterol below 5.0 mmol/L [193 mg/dL]), and in men without cardiovascular disease, there is benefit from lowering abnormally high cholesterol levels ("primary prevention"). Primary prevention in women was originally practiced only by extension of the findings in studies on men, since, in women, none of the large statin trials conducted prior to 2007 demonstrated a significant reduction in overall mortality or in cardiovascular endpoints. Meta-analyses have demonstrated significant reductions in all-cause and cardiovascular mortality, without significant heterogeneity by sex.

Risk for heart disease
Level		Interpretation
mg/dL	mmol/L	Interpretation
< 200	< 5.2	Desirable level (lower risk)
200–240	5.2–6.2	Borderline high risk
> 240	> 6.2	High risk

The 1987 report of National Cholesterol Education Program, Adult Treatment Panels suggests the total blood cholesterol level should be: < 200 mg/dL normal blood cholesterol, 200‍–‍239 mg/dL borderline-high, > 240 mg/dL high cholesterol. The American Heart Association provides a similar set of guidelines for total (fasting) blood cholesterol levels and risk for heart disease: Statins are effective in lowering LDL cholesterol and widely used for primary prevention in people at high risk of cardiovascular disease, as well as in secondary prevention for those who have developed cardiovascular disease. The average global mean total cholesterol for humans has remained at about 4.6 mmol/L (178 mg/dL) for men and women, both crude and age standardized, for nearly 40 years from 1980 to 2018, with some regional variations and reduction of total cholesterol in Western nations.

More current testing methods determine LDL ("bad") and HDL ("good") cholesterol separately, allowing cholesterol analysis to be more nuanced. The desirable LDL level is considered to be less than 100 mg/dL (2.6 mmol/L).

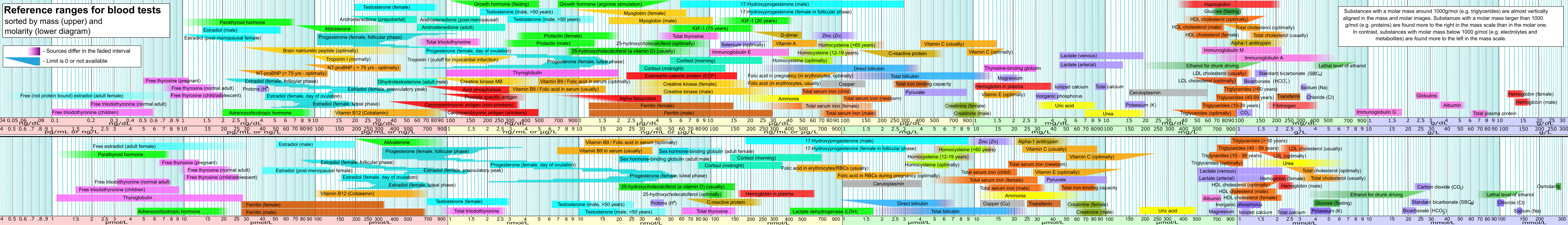
Reference ranges for blood tests, showing usual, as well as optimal, levels of HDL, LDL, and total cholesterol in mass and molar concentrations, is found in orange color at right, that is, among the blood constituents with the highest concentration.

Total cholesterol is defined as the sum of HDL, LDL, and VLDL. Usually, only the total, HDL, and triglycerides are measured. For cost reasons, the VLDL is usually estimated as one-fifth of the triglycerides, and the LDL is estimated using the Friedewald formula (or a variant): estimated LDL = [total cholesterol] − [total HDL] − [estimated VLDL]. Direct LDL measures are used when triglycerides exceed 400 mg/dL. The estimated VLDL and LDL have more error when triglycerides are above 400 mg/dL.

In the Framingham Heart Study, each 10 mg/dL (0.6 mmol/L) increase in total cholesterol levels increased 30-year overall mortality by 5% and CVD mortality by 9%. While subjects over the age of 50 had an 11% increase in overall mortality, and a 14% increase in cardiovascular disease mortality per 1 mg/dL (0.06 mmol/L) year drop in total cholesterol levels. The researchers attributed this phenomenon to a different correlation, whereby the disease itself increases the risk of death, as well as changing a myriad of factors, such as weight loss and the inability to eat, which lower serum cholesterol. This effect was also shown in men of all ages and women over 50 in the Vorarlberg Health Monitoring and Promotion Programme. These groups were more likely to die of cancer, liver diseases, and mental diseases with very low total cholesterol, of 186 mg/dL (10.3 mmol/L) and lower. This result indicates the low-cholesterol effect occurs even among younger respondents, contradicting the previous assessment among cohorts of older people that this is a marker for frailty occurring with age.

=== Hypocholesterolemia ===
Abnormally low levels of cholesterol are termed hypocholesterolemia. Research into the causes of this state is relatively limited, but some studies suggest a link with depression, cancer, and cerebral hemorrhage. In general, the low cholesterol levels seem to be a consequence, rather than a cause, of an underlying illness. A genetic defect in cholesterol synthesis causes Smith–Lemli–Opitz syndrome, often associated with low plasma cholesterol levels. Hyperthyroidism, or any other endocrine disturbance that causes upregulation of the LDL receptor, may result in hypocholesterolemia.

=== Testing ===
The American Heart Association recommends testing cholesterol every four to six years for people aged 20 years or older. A separate set of American Heart Association guidelines issued in 2013 indicates that people taking statin medications should have their cholesterol tested 4–12 weeks after their first dose and then every 3–12 months thereafter. For men ages 45 to 65 and women ages 55 to 65, a cholesterol test should be performed every one to two years, and an annual test should be performed for seniors over the age of 65.

After 12 hours of fasting, a blood sample is taken by a healthcare professional from an arm vein to measure a lipid profile for a) total cholesterol, b) HDL cholesterol, c) LDL cholesterol, and d) triglycerides. Results may be expressed as "calculated", indicating a calculation of total cholesterol, HDL, and triglycerides.

Cholesterol is tested to determine for "normal" or "desirable" levels if a person has a total cholesterol of 5.2 mmol/L or less (200 mg/dL), an HDL value of more than 1 mmol/L (40 mg/dL, "the higher, the better"), an LDL value of less than 2.6 mmol/L (100 mg/dL), and a triglycerides level of less than 1.7 mmol/L (150 mg/dL). Blood cholesterol in people with lifestyle, aging, or cardiovascular risk factors, such as diabetes mellitus, hypertension, family history of coronary artery disease, or angina, are evaluated at different levels.

== Interactive pathway map ==
Click on genes, proteins and metabolites below to link to respective articles. (Note: The interactive pathway map can be edited at WikiPathways: "Statin_Pathway_WP430".)

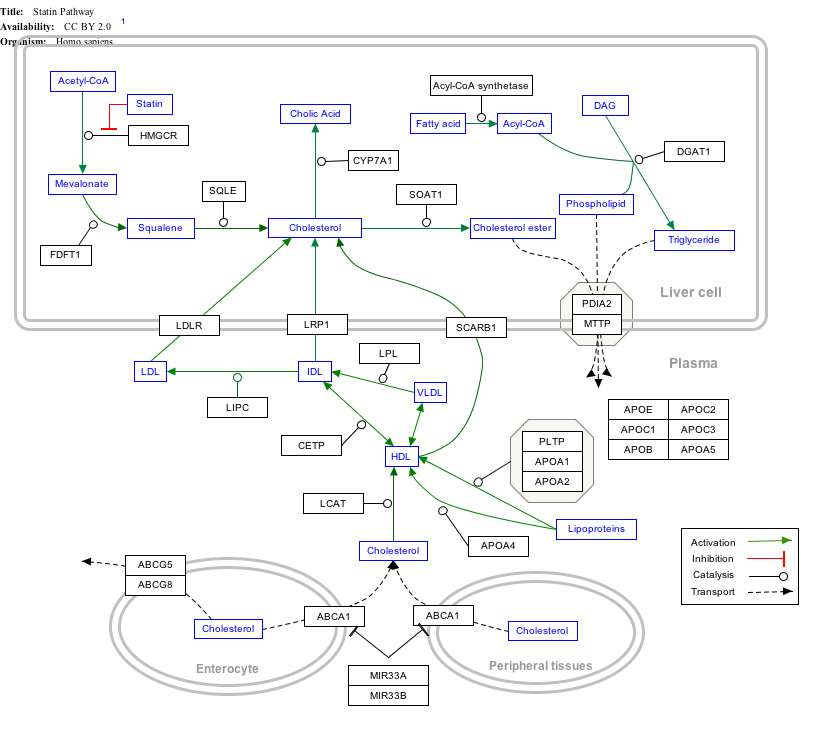

Statin pathway edit

== Cholesteric liquid crystals ==
Some cholesterol derivatives (among other simple cholesteric lipids) are known to generate the cholesteric liquid crystalline phase. The cholesteric phase is, in fact, a chiral nematic phase, and it changes color when its temperature changes. This makes cholesterol derivatives useful for indicating temperature in liquid-crystal thermometers and in temperature-sensitive paints.

== Stereoisomers ==
nat-cholesterol (top) and ent-cholesterol (bottom)

Cholesterol has 256 stereoisomers that arise from its eight stereocenters. Only two of the stereoisomers have biochemical significance: nat-cholesterol and ent-cholesterol (for natural and enantiomer, respectively). The only cholesterol stereoisomer to occur naturally is nat-cholesterol.

== Additional images ==
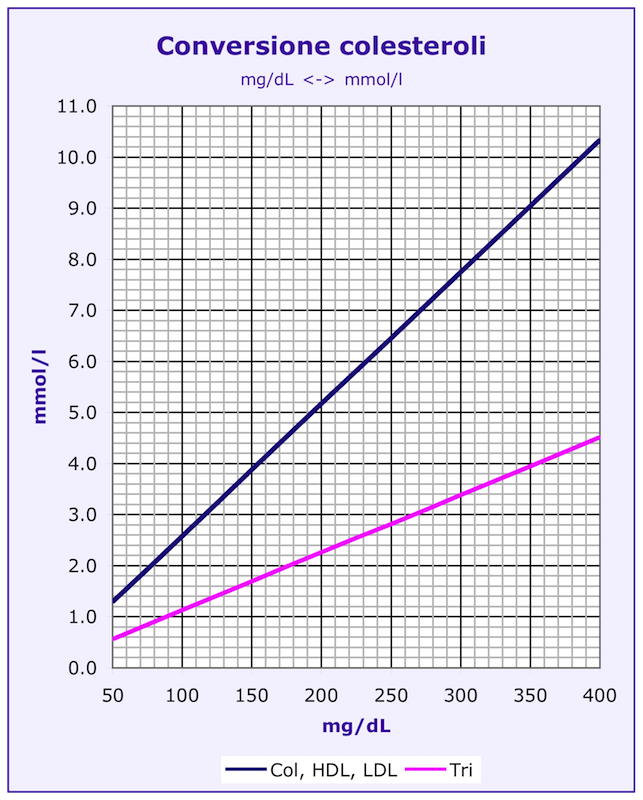
Cholesterol units conversion

Steroidogenesis, using cholesterol as building material

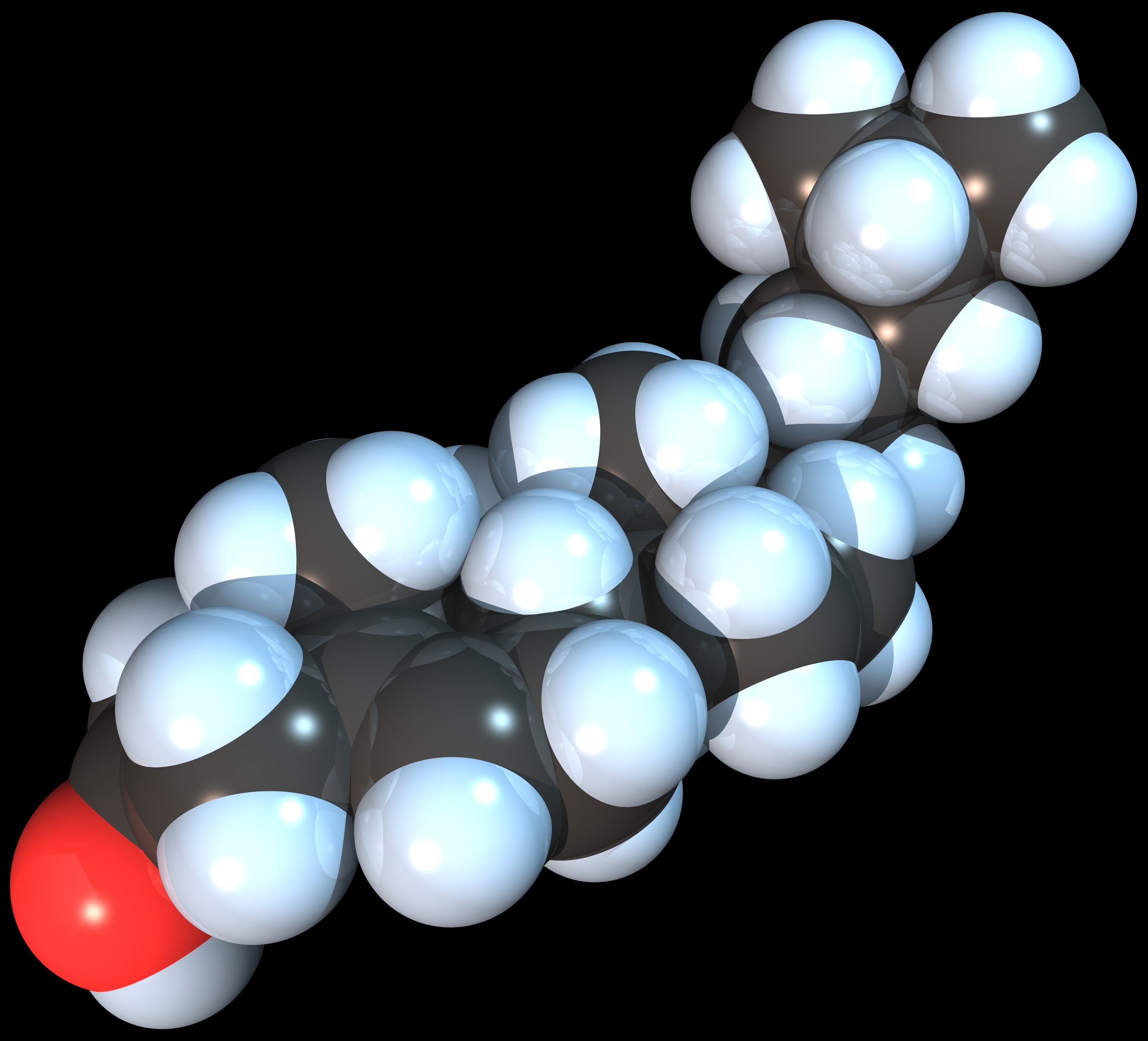
Space-filling model of the Cholesterol molecule

Numbering of the steroid nuclei

== See also ==
- Arcus senilis "Cholesterol ring" in the eyes
- Cardiovascular disease – Disease involving heart or blood vessels
- Cholesterol embolism
- Cholesterol total synthesis
- Familial hypercholesterolemia – Genetic disorder characterized by high cholesterol levels
- Hypercholesterolemia – High levels of cholesterol in the blood
- Hypocholesterolemia
- Janus-faced molecule
- List of cholesterol in foods
- Niemann–Pick disease – Medical condition
- Oxycholesterol
- Remnant cholesterol – Atherogenic lipoprotein
