= Janny =

Janny may refer to:

== People ==
=== Surname ===
- Georg Janny (1864-1935), Austrian landscape painter and set designer

=== Given name ===
- Janny Brandes-Brilleslijper (1916–2003), Dutch Holocaust survivor, among the last people to see Anne Frank
- Janny Knol (born 1969), Dutch police officer
- Janny Sikazwe (born 1979), Zambian football referee
- Janny Wurts (born 1953), American fantasy novelist and illustrator

== Other ==
- Internet slang for Forum Moderator, in the sense that they are the "Janitor" of a community.

== See also ==
- Jenny (disambiguation)
- Jannie
