= Jaani =

Jaani may refer to:

- Jaani, Estonia, a village in western Estonia

== People with the name ==
- Jaani (songwriter), Indian songwriter from Punjab
- Jaani Peuhu (born 1978), Finnish musician
- Getter Jaani (born 1993), Estonian singer and actress
- Karin Jaani (1952–2009), Estonian diplomat and politician
- Kristian Jaani (born 1976), Estonian police officer and politician

== See also ==
- Jyani (disambiguation)
- Janis (disambiguation)
- Jaani (disambiguation)
