= Janis =

Janis may refer to:

== Film and music ==
- Janis (film), a 1974 film about Janis Joplin
  - Janis (1975 album), a compilation and the soundtrack album for the film
  - Janis (1993 album), a Joplin career overview collection
- "Janis", a track recorded by Focus on their 1971 album Focus II

== Fictional characters ==
- Janis Gold, in the TV series 24
- Janis Day, in the comic strip Arlo and Janis
- Janis Hawk, in the TV series FlashForward
- Janis Ian, in the film Mean Girls
- Janis (ジャニス, "Janisu"), in Inuyasha: Secret of the Divine Jewel

== People ==
- Janis (given name)
- Janis (surname)
- Jānis, a Latvian masculine given name

== Other uses ==
- Janus (disambiguation)
- Jani (disambiguation)
- Janice (disambiguation)
- United States v. Janis, a 1976 U.S. Supreme Court case
