= List of cholesterol in foods =

This list consists of common foods with their cholesterol content recorded in milligrams per 100 grams (3.5 ounces) of food.

== Functions ==
Cholesterol is a sterol, a steroid-like lipid made by animals, including humans. The human body makes one-eighth to one-fourth teaspoons of pure cholesterol daily. A cholesterol level of 5.5 millimoles per litre or below is recommended for an adult. The rise of cholesterol in the body can give a condition in which excessive cholesterol is deposited in artery walls called atherosclerosis. This condition blocks the blood flow to vital organs which can result in high blood pressure or stroke. Cholesterol is not always bad. It's a vital part of the cell wall and a precursor to substances such as brain matter and some sex hormones. There are some types of cholesterol which are beneficial to the heart and blood vessels. High-density lipoprotein is commonly called "good" cholesterol. These lipoproteins help in the removal of cholesterol from the cells, which is then transported back to the liver where it is disintegrated and excreted as waste or broken down into parts.

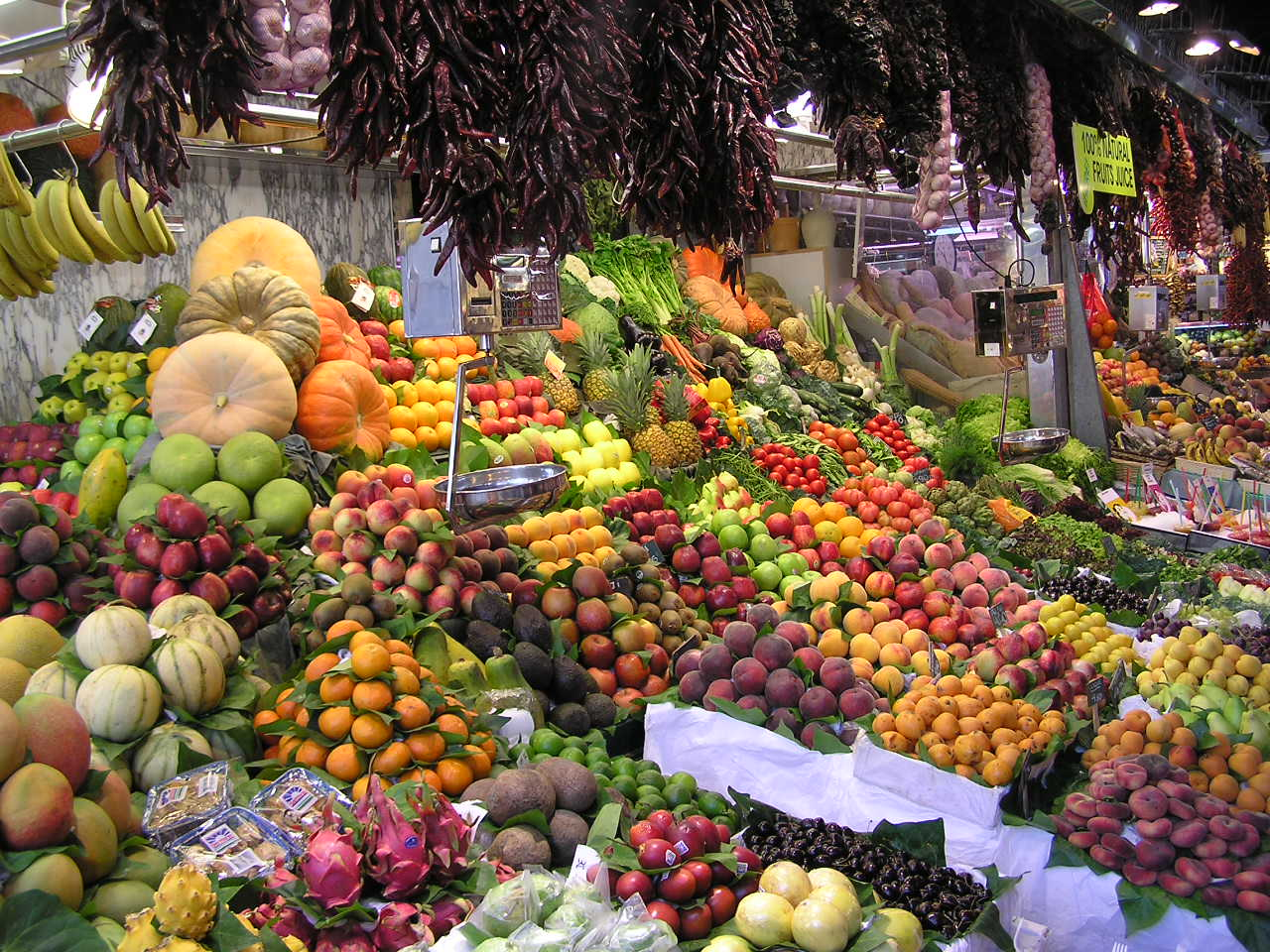
Fruits are zero-cholesterol foods.

== Cholesterol content of various foods ==
High cholesterol foods	Cholesterol mg per 100 grams
Beef brain	3100
Egg yolk	1085
Caviar	588
Fishing oil, menhaden	521
Foie Gras	515
Roe	479
Egg	373
Lamb kidney	337
Pork liver	301
Clarified butter; Ghee	256
Butter	215
Oyster	206
Lobster	200
Pate	150
Heavy whipping cream	137
Crab meat (Alaskan King)	127
Shrimp	125
Light whipping cream (30-36% fat)	111
Cream cheese	110
Yellow cheese (about 1 cup (~240 mL))	108

Moderate cholesterol foods	Cholesterol mg per 100 grams
Lard	97
Beef	90
Chicken	88
Pork	80
Pressurized whipped cream	76
Fish	70
Light Cream (18% fat)	66
Sour cream, cultured (20% fat)	52
Custard	51
Ice cream	47
Evaporated milk	29

Low cholesterol foods	Cholesterol mg per 100 grams
Cottage cheese (4% fat)	15
Yogurt; Frozen yogurt	13
Greek yogurt	9
Low fat yogurt	6
Skimmed milk	4
Skimmed milk yogurt	2
Egg whites	0
Fruits	0
Grains	0
Nuts	0

== See also ==
- Nutrition
- Plant stanol ester
- Fatty acid
