= Janus (star) =

Double-faced white dwarf star in the constellation Cygnus

ZTF J203349.8+322901.1
Observation data Epoch J2000 Equinox ICRS
- Constellation: Cygnus
- Right ascension: 20^{h} 33^{m} 49.805^{s}
- Declination: +32° 29′ 01.21″

Characteristics
- Evolutionary stage: White dwarf

Astrometry
Proper motion (μ)	RA: 3.479 mas/yr Dec.: -6.971 mas/yr
Parallax (π)	2.4525±0.4364 mas
Distance	approx. 1,300 ly (approx. 410 pc)

Details
Mass	1.2 to 1.27 M_{☉}
Radius	3400+700 −600 km
Temperature	34900+1300 −1500 K (hydrogen side); 36700+1300 −1600 K (helium side) K
Rotation	14.97 minutes

Other designations
- Janus; Gaia 1863529616173400576; ZTF J203349.8+322901.1; ZTF J2033+3229

Database references
SIMBAD	data

Janus, also known by its name ZTF J203349.8+322901.1, is a transitioning white dwarf located more than 1,300 light-years (400 pc) away in the constellation Cygnus, discovered in 2019 by the Zwicky Transient Facility (ZTF), located at the Palomar Observatory, while looking for periodically variable white dwarfs. Subsequent observations using the Low-Resolution Imaging Spectrometer (LRIS) on the W. M. Keck Observatory discovered its two-faced nature, with one hemisphere dominated by hydrogen, and the other dominated by helium.

== Properties ==
ZTF J203349.8+322901.1 is located more than 1,300 light-years (400 pc) away in the constellation Cygnus, with a mass between 1.2 M_{☉} and 1.27 M_{☉} (1.21 for an oxygen–neon core and 1.27 for a carbon–oxygen core), a radius of 3400+700
−600 km and a surface temperature of approximately 35,000 Kelvin. It is rare in that it has two hemispheres of different gases, one dominated by hydrogen, and the other dominated by helium. Another star, GD 323, shares this feature, albeit much more subtle.

Janus' rotation period was observed by using CHIMERA, a high-speed imaging photometer, and HiPERCAM, a quintuple-beam imager (data collected on the nights of 6 and 9 September 2021 for a total of 2.1 hours), both located on the Gran Telescopio Canarias, which revealed a period of 14.97 minutes, which is much faster than what is usually observed in white dwarfs (hours to days). As it rotates, its spectrum transitions from only hydrogen lines to only helium lines at phases ≈ 0 and 0.5, respectively. There was no Zeeman splitting observed. The two hemispheres were measured to be at different temperatures, with the hydrogen side at 34900+1300
−1500 K and the helium side at 36700+1300
−1600 K.

== Theories ==
There are some theories as to why ZTF J203349.8+322901.1's hemispheres are so starkly defined and of different compositions.

The first theory revolves around the belief that white dwarfs undergo an evolutionary phase, where helium sinks towards the bottom and hydrogen rises towards the top due to their masses. It is theorised that Janus was observed in an intermediate stage of this phase, and is exiting the DB gap on its way to becoming a DB white dwarf.

The second theory is based on asymmetric magnetic fields: If one hemisphere has a stronger magnetic field than the other, then the magnetic pressure at the pole will be higher, causing the hydrogen to diffuse towards the pole due to the ion pressure gradient, requiring a magnetic field of at least tens of kGs, and less than a few MG.

The third theory revolves around ZTF J203349.8+322901.1 being the result of a merger of two white dwarfs, due to its large mass and short rotation period.
