= Janus-faced molecule =

A Janus molecule (or Janus-faced molecule) is a molecule which can represent both beneficial and toxic effects. The term Janus-faced molecule is derived from the ancient Roman god, Janus. Janus is depicted as having two faces; one facing the past and one facing the future. This is synonymous to a Janus molecule having two distinct purposes: a beneficial and a toxic purpose depending on its quantity.

== Examples ==
Examples of a Janus-faced molecule are nitric oxide and cholesterol. In the case of cholesterol, the property that makes cholesterol useful in cell membranes, namely its absolute insolubility in water, also makes it lethal. When cholesterol accumulates in the wrong place, for example within the walls of an artery, it cannot be readily mobilized, and its presence eventually leads to the development of an atherosclerotic plaque.

One such example of a Janus-faced molecule is S100A8/A9 protein complex; this complex is associated with autoimmune and abnormal growth of cells disorders. While S100 is integral in the fight against cancer, S100 can also induce phagocytes that phagocytize malignant tumor cells, resulting in apoptosis.

Proteoglycans are another class of molecules that display this duality, under certain chemical conditions these molecules can emerge as inhibitors or promoters. Recent studies have shown that proteoglycans can play an integral role in the metastasis of cancer. Another molecule that falls within this class of molecules is DKK1. This molecule's presence can trigger cancers to display both metastatic as well as anti-metastatic properties especially pertaining to breast cancers. It has been studied that DKK1 secretion can be associated with promoting breast cancer metastasis to the bone as well as the suppression of metastasis to the lungs. Botulinum neurotoxins also portray these dichotomous roles. This specific molecule is formed by Clostridium Botulinum, a spore forming bacteria. If this bacteria contaminates food, the results can be fatal and can lead to death. Yet, despite their toxicity which is lethal even in small doses, these molecules can be used in a wide array of pharmacological applications; one such application is the one utilized in cosmetology .

Gamma peptide nucleic acid (PNA) (synthetic DNA and RNA analogs) is another Janus molecule which slips between DNA strands. The gamma PNA could be inserted between strands of DNA or RNA to recognize sequences or elements that could potentially cause known diseases through its bifacial recognition. It does so by inserting itself when the DNA or RNA strand is undergoing transcription to conduction transcriptional regulation. However, there are still ongoing challenges with this Janus molecule that requires further research and experimentation.

Some fungi are capable of producing secondary metabolites called mycotoxins which are toxic and affect human and animal health. Mycotoxins are often found in farmed ingredients such as corn and rice while it is being harvested or kept in storage; When these ingredients are largely manufactured towards humans and animals, there is the possibly of consumption of these toxins. The toxicity of these mycotoxins were intensively studied and appeared to be affective in killing microbes as well as inhibiting/killing tumor cell growth. This exhibits janus-faced molecule characteristics because it kills indiscriminately. A consequence of using mycotoxins against tumor cell growth in cancer treatment is an increase risk of mutations.

== See also ==
- Janus
- Toxicity
