= Janus (comics) =

Janus, in comics, may refer to:

- Janus (DC Comics), an alias of the DC Comics character Two-Face
- Janus (Marvel Comics), a Marvel Comics character, the son of Dracula
- Janus (Ultraverse), a character in the Ultraverse
- Janus Directive, a DC Comics crossover event
- Janus Stark, a Smash! comic character
- Judge Janus, a Judge Dredd character
