= HMS Janus =

Six ships of the Royal Navy have borne the name HMS Janus, after Janus, the two-faced God of Roman mythology:

- HMS Janus (1778) was a 44-gun fifth rate launched in 1778. She was renamed HMS Dromedary later that year, and was wrecked in 1800 on the Parasol Rocks in Trinidad.
- HMS Janus (1796) was a 32-gun fifth rate, previously the Dutch Argo. She was captured by HMS Phoenix in 1796, placed on harbour service from 1798 and was sold in 1811.
- HMS Janus (1844) was a wood paddle sloop launched in 1844 and sold in 1856.
- HMS Janus (1856) was a Clown-class wood screw gunboat launched in 1856. She was used as a coal lighter from 1869 and was renamed YC 6. She was sold in 1917.
- HMS Janus (1895) was a Janus-class destroyer launched in 1895 and reclassified as an A-class destroyer in 1913. She was sold in 1914.
- HMS Janus (F53) was a J-class destroyer launched in 1938 and sunk in 1944.
