= Jannis Zotos =

German musician

- Born: 3 May 1958 (age 66); Dresden, East Germany

Jannis Zotos (born 3 May 1958) is a German musician, composer, arranger and guitar teacher of Greek origin. He is also the owner and manager of the jazz club b-flat in Berlin.

He studied classical guitar at the renowned Hochschule für Musik „Hanns Eisler“ in Berlin and he also masters Bouzouki and Oud instruments. His personal focus is on Rebetiko music, so called Asia Minor music and traditional Greek music. He used to be a member of the group percussion & strings. In 1990 he founded the Rebetiko band Zotos Kompania together with his brother Thanassis Zotos. Greek television ERT produced a documentary about the band touring Greece. Amongst many others, Jannis Zotos did projects together with Mikis Theodorakis, Maria Farantouri or Dimitra Galani. He did numerous recordings both as a sideman and under his own name. He teaches guitar at the Freie Musikschule Potsdam and lives in Berlin, Germany.

== Discography ==
- Deviation - Zotos Kompania live in Concert (Cooleur, 1995)
- Zotos Kompanía: Lethargía (Anjoke, 2004)
- Jannis Zotos & Band: Die leisen Stimmen der Erinnerung (Oudattack Records, 2007)
- Jannis Zotos: Amour fou (Maria Polidouri, Kostas Karyotakis)(Oudattack Records, 2013)
