= Jannie =

Jannie is a given name. Notable people with the name include:

- Jannie Blackwell, American politician
- Jannie Bornman (born 1980), South African rugby union player
- Jannie Borst, Dutch cancer immunologist
- Jannie Boshoff (born 1986), South African rugby union player
- Jannie Chan, Singaporean businesswoman
- Jannie de Beer (born 1971), South African rugby union player
- Jannie de Groot (1930–2011), Dutch swimmer
- Jannie du Plessis (born 1982), South African rugby union player
- Jannie Engelbrecht (born 1938), South African rugby union player
- Jannie Habig, South African rally driver
- Jannie Hansen (born 1963), Danish footballer
- Jannie Mouton, South African billionaire
- Jannie Salcedo (born 1988), Colombian cyclist
- Jannie Stander (born 1993), South African rugby union player
- Jannie van Eyck-Vos (1936–2020), Dutch javelin thrower and middle-distance runner
- Jannie Visscher (born 1961), Dutch politician

== See also ==
- Janny
