= Josef Antonín Janiš =

Czech priest and beekeeper

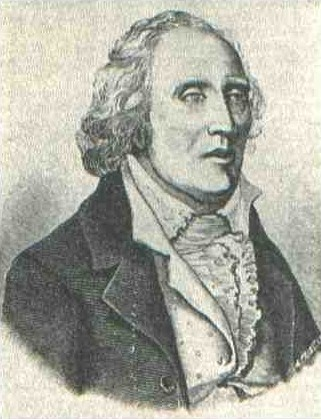

Josef Antonín Janiš (Germanized as Joseph Janisch; 6 February 1749 – 15 November 1821) was a Czech Catholic priest and beekeeper. He wrote several books on bee-keeping in the Czech language and in 1789 he was among the first to suggest parthenogenetic development of drones from the eggs of unfertilized queen bees.

== Biography ==
Janiš was born in Lanškroun and studied theology. He became a parish priest at Hostivař near Prague in 1789. Between 1777 and 1804 he translated several works into Czech including a work on bees by Anton Janša in 1777 under the pseudonym J. A. Trutnovský. He also wrote a book on flax cultivation in 1816. He practiced beekeeping and wrote on both agriculture and apiculture. In 1796 he moved to Hněvčeves and lived there until his death. He introduced portable hives and several of his writings were unpublished at the time of his death. He was made a corresponding member of the KK ökonomisch-patriotische Gesellschaft im Königreich Böhmen in 1795. In 1789 he experimentally proved that an unfertilized queen bee produces only eggs that produced drones.
