= Janus Experiments =

The Janus Experiments investigated the effects of exposure to neutron radiation and gamma radiation on mice and dogs. They consisted of ten large-scale experiments conducted at Argonne National Laboratory from 1972 to 1989. To explore various relationships, the studies varied radiation type, dose rates, total dose, and fractionation. The reactor used in these experiments had two convex radiation faces for delivering different neutron intensities to two adjacent exposure rooms—one for low-level and the other for high-level irradiation. The experiments were named after Janus, the Roman god with two opposite faces as a result.

The work served as the basis for dozens of publications in the medical literature. The original studies were funded by the United States Department of Energy (DOE) with later grants from NASA. Additional funding from the Department of Energy enabled researchers at Northwestern University to make histopathological data from the mouse and dog studies publicly available. Radiation researchers are permitted to search for and request for specific tissues from the studies' archives.

Studies of the survival and causes of death of control groups of mice and dogs that were not exposed to radiation served as the basis for the development by S. Jay Olshansky and Bruce A. Carnes of their biodemographic theory of intrinsic mortality.
