= Janice =

Janice may refer to:

- Janice (given name), a feminine given name (includes a list of people with the name)
- Samsung Galaxy S Advance, codename Janice, an Android smartphone
- "Janice", a 2023 song by Dilaw
- Janice, Łódź Voivodeship (central Poland)
- Janice, Lower Silesian Voivodeship (south-west Poland)
- Janice, Rimavská Sobota District, a village in southern Slovakia
- Janice, Mississippi, an unincorporated community in Perry County, Mississippi, United States

== See also ==
- Janis (disambiguation)
