= Jani, Iran =

Jani جاني
- Village
- Location within Iran
- Coordinates: 31°00′16″N 61°47′28″E
- Country: Iran
- Province: Sistan and Baluchestan
- County: Hirmand
- Bakhsh: Central
- Rural District: Jahanabad

Population (2006)
  - Total: 269
- Time zone: UTC+3:30 (IRST)
  - Summer (DST): UTC+4:30 (IRDT)

Jani (Persian: جاني, also Romanized as Jānī; also known as Deh-e Jānī Meylak and Jani Saiyid) is a village in Jahanabad Rural District, in the Central District of Hirmand County, Sistan and Baluchestan Province, Iran. At the 2006 census, its population was 269, in 60 families.
