= Jyani =

Jyani may refer to:

- Surjit Kumar Jyani (fl. from 1997), Indian politician
- Shyam Sunder Jyani (born 1979), Indian environmentalist
- Jyani, a village in Jayal Tehsil, Rajasthan, India

== See also ==
- Jani (disambiguation)
- Gyani, an honorific title in Sikhism
