= Apolipoprotein L =

Identifiers
- Symbol: ApoL
- Pfam: PF05461
- InterPro: IPR008405
Available protein structures:
- PDB: IPR008405 PF05461 (ECOD; PDBsum)
- AlphaFold: IPR008405; PF05461

Apolipoprotein L (Apo L) is found in high-density lipoprotein complexes that plays a central role in cholesterol transport. The cholesterol content of membranes is important in cellular processes such as modulating gene transcription and signal transduction both in the adult brain and during neurodevelopment. There are six apo L genes located close to each other on chromosome 22q12 in humans. 22q12 is a confirmed high-susceptibility locus for schizophrenia and close to the region associated with velocardiofacial syndrome that includes symptoms of schizophrenia.

== Human proteins containing this domain ==
APOL1; APOL2; APOL3; APOL4; APOL5; APOL6; APOLD1;
