= Lipophorin =

Class of insect proteins

apolipophorin

Identifiers
- Organism: Drosophila melanogaster
- Symbol: apolpp
- Entrez: 43827
- Orthologs: NCBI: entry; OMA: entry
- RefSeq (mRNA): NM_079895.3
- RefSeq (Prot): NP_524634.2
- UniProt: Q9V496

Other data
- Chromosome: 4: 1.06 - 1.08 Mb
Search for
- Structures: Swiss-model
- Domains: InterPro

Lipophorin is a lipid-carrying protein of insects, first identified in 1981, and is the major lipoprotein in the plasma of insects. Lipophorin has been identified in all insect species, in every life stage. Recently, additional nomenclature has been introduced to designate specific lipophorin subspecies that differ in lipid and/or apoprotein content. The concentration of lipophorin subspecies (HDLp and LDLp) changes can be considered to reflect the physiological state of the organism with respect to lipid metabolism. The versatility of this particle concerning its lipid binding capacity may be unparalleled in nature.

== Biosynthesis ==
Lipophorins are synthesized in fat body and secreted into hemolymph. In larval Manduca sexta, nascent lipophorin particles were synthesized from fat body cells and they associate with phospholipid to form a nascent Very High Density Lipophorin (VHDLp), which is essentially devoid of diacylglycerol. The VHDLp is then secreted into the hemolymph, where it later interacts with the mid gut to load DAG, which is derived from dietary lipids. The maturation of lipophorin into circulating High Density Lipophorin (HDLp) results in a density shift from 1.26 to 1.15 g/ml with no change in apoprotein content. The lipophorin contains two structural apolipoproteins, derived from ApoLp-II/I precursor by enzymatic cleavage (furin). Furin is a member of the proprotein convertase family of subtilisin like serine endoproteases that is mainly active in the trans-Golgi network. The favored consensus substrate sequence for furin, R-X-K/R-R, is present in all precursor sequences characterized to date. In agreement with the activity of furin, Locusta migratoria ApoLp II/I precursor appears to be cleaved C-terminal of its furin substrate sequence, RQKR, as indicated by the N-terminal sequence of ApoLp I.

== Structure ==
Lipophorins are large, amphipathic complexes composed of proteins and lipids. They are structurally similar to vertebrate lipoproteins, like low-density lipoproteins (LDLp) and high-density lipoproteins (HDLp). The core of a lipophorin particle typically consists of nonpolar lipids, such as diacylglycerols and hydrocarbons, surrounded by a layer of phospholipids, cholesterol, and apolipoproteins.

For HDLp, there is a remarkable abundance of a single lipoprotein particle in the hemolymph of insects. HDLp-reuse discrimination is one of the characteristics that strain it to be a reusable shuttle for the lipids within the target tissue. HDLp is largely a spherical particle about 450–600 kDa and has a density similar to that of a mammalian HDLp (~ 1.12 g/ml). This is usually containing DAG as its predominant lipid in addition to phospholipids, sterols, and hydrocarbons. The lipoprotein generally contains one copy of each of the two non-exchangeable apolipoproteins, viz. apolipophorin I (apoLp-I) and apolipophorin II (apoLp-II; weighing ~ 240 and ~ 80 kDa, respectively), derived from a single common precursor protein by post-translational cleavage. As a novel molecular characterization of the apolipophorin precursor, it has recently been revealed for a few insect species that the protein is arranged with apoLp-II at the N-terminal end and apoLp-I at C-terminal end (thus also termed as apoLp-II/I). At the N-terminus of apoLp-I, followed by the amino acid sequence RQKR, similar to the other apolipophorin precursors known to date, in locust apoLp-II/I (3359 aa residues). Therefore, it is likely that during the proteolytic processing of this precursor protein to generate apoLp-II and apoLp-I, dibasic processing endoproteases of the subtilisin family are involved.

== Types ==
Lipophorin exists in three subspecies, each serving specialized functions in lipid transport within insects. The primary forms are high-density lipophorin (HDLp) and low-density lipophorin (LDLp). HDLp acts as the principal circulating lipoprotein, shuttling lipids such as diacylglycerol, phospholipids and sterols throughout the hemolymph. LDLp is derived from HDLp during periods of high lipid transport demand, such as flight or vitellogenesis, as it becomes enriched with diacylglycerol. Additionally, very high-density lipophorin (VHDLp), found in some species, primarily carries hydrocarbons. These subspecies work together dynamically, adapting to the insect’s metabolic and developmental needs.

== Function ==
Lipophorin is an incredible lipid-transporting protein studied in insects. Lipophorin is an important protein whose lipid metabolism and transfer are critical in general. Lipophorin is the main carrier of different lipids, such as diacylglycerol (DAG), hydrocarbons, phospholipids, and sterols, into insect hemolymph (blood). Invertebrate lipophorin carries these molecules from storage organs such as body fat to energy demanding or structural lipid – dependent tissues in the organism. A unique feature of lipophorin is its storage effectiveness, as it is able to shuttle lipids multiple times without being destroyed in the process. Thus, it is a very useful means of lipid transport over a long period of time.

While flying, diacylglycerol from lipophorin is being carried to the flight muscles, where it gets converted into energy through β-oxidation. Lipophorin is also necessary for cholesterol transport and performs functions similar to HDL in humans, such as membrane synthesis and hormone production. Interaction with such other proteins as lipid transfer particles (LTP) provides lipophorin with dynamic flexibility in transferring and uptake lipids. Combined with the metabolic state of the insect, the idea of adaptability within the lipophorin is further strengthening its versatility and performance level.

During vitellogenesis, lipophorin transports lipids like diacylglycerol (DAG) from the fat body to the ovaries, where they are used for yolk formation in developing oocytes. Acting as a reusable shuttle, it interacts with ovarian receptors to deliver lipids essential for vitellogenin synthesis and lipid-rich yolk deposition. This efficient lipid transport is crucial for oocyte maturation and successful embryogenesis. Lipophorin was present in nurse cells and follicle cells and marginally with perioocyte space in immature ovariole. In the mature ovariole, nurse cell was narcotized and lipophorin appeared in follicular cell. Its illustrate that lipids and proteins gradually accumulated in the developing ovary. But lipophorin was endocytic uptake in immature ovariole, after the maturation uptake halted.

Lipophorin transports the hydrophobic molecule from origin to destination in time specific manner. All hydrocarbons bound in a lipid binding pocket, most of these sharing the same binding sites for hydrophobic interaction and hydrogen bonding. Overall findings elucidated that lipophorin associated with different hydrocarbons by hydrogen bonds and hydrophobic interactions, and each of the hydrocarbon having various functional roles.
