= Apolipophorin III =

ApoLp-III
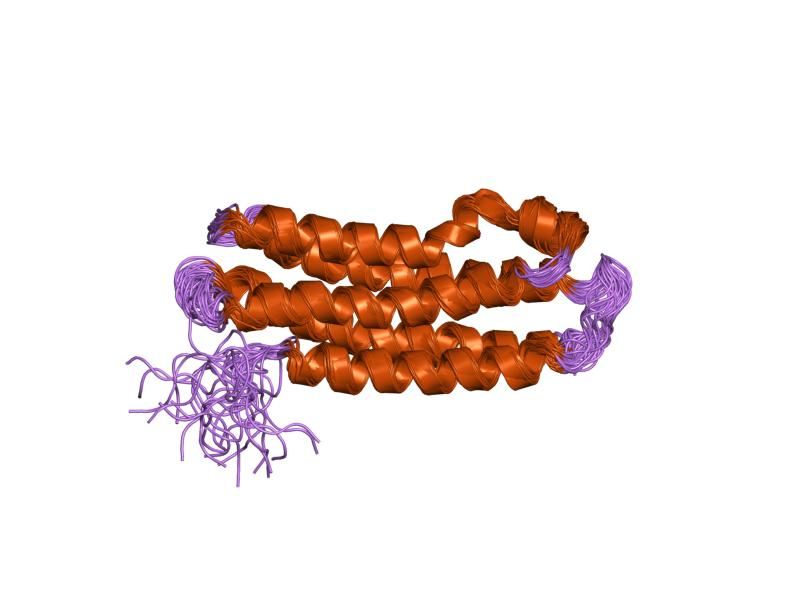
- nmr structure of an exchangeable apolipoprotein-manduca sexta apolipophorin-iii

Identifiers
- Symbol: ApoLp-III
- Pfam: PF07464
- InterPro: IPR010009
- SCOP2: 1eq1 / SCOPe / SUPFAM
Available protein structures:
- PDB: IPR010009 PF07464 (ECOD; PDBsum)
- AlphaFold: IPR010009; PF07464

In molecular biology, the apolipophorin III family of proteins are a family of exchangeable apolipoproteins. Exchangeable apolipoproteins constitute a functionally important family of proteins that play critical roles in lipid transport and lipoprotein metabolism. Apolipophorin III (apoLp-III) is a prototypical exchangeable apolipoprotein found in many insect species that functions in transport of diacylglycerol (DAG) from the fat body lipid storage depot to flight muscles in the adult life stage. The special lipoproteins they form are called lipophorins. High-density lipophorin is characterized by its association with a lower proportion of lipid. It interacts with more lipid and stabilize by Apolipophorin III to form low-density lipophorin. This transformation occurs through tightly regulated and precisely timed processes.
