= PRP36 =

Extracellular protein in Homo sapiens

LOC105371752

Identifiers
- Aliases: PRP36
- External IDs: GeneCards: ; OMA:- orthologs
Orthologs
Species	Human	Mouse
Entrez	n/a	n/a
Ensembl	n/a	n/a
UniProt	n a	n/a
RefSeq (mRNA)	n/a	n/a
RefSeq (protein)	n/a	n/a
Location (UCSC)	n/a	n/a
PubMed search		n/a
- Wikidata
View/Edit Human

PRP36 (Proline Rich Protein 36) is an extracellular protein in Homo sapiens that is encoded by the PRR36 (Proline Rich Region 36) gene that contains a domain of unknown function, DUF4596, towards the C terminus of the protein. The function of PRP36 is unknown, but high gene expression has been observed in various regions of the brain such as the prefrontal cortex, cerebellum, and the amygdala. PRP36 has one alias: Putative Uncharacterized Protein FLJ22184.

== Gene ==
The human PRR36 gene consists of 7 exons and is 5723 base pairs long.

=== Locus ===
PRR36 is located on the short arm of human chromosome 19 at 19p13.2 (region 1, band 3, and sub-band 2). The gene spans between base pair numbers 7868719 and 7874441 on chromosome 19 and is located between two other genes—LYPLA2P2, a pseudogene, and EVI5L, a gene which produces a protein that regulates Rab GTPase activity.

Relative location of PRR36 on the short arm of Chromosome 19

=== mRNA and splice variants ===
Alternative splicing of the PRR36 gene results in two transcript variants. PRR36 (FLJ22184) Transcript Variant 1, seen in the image below, is 4518 base pairs long and consists of six exons, of which the last five are utilized in protein coding. The protein produced, PRP36, is made up of 1346 amino acids. PRR36 Transcript Variant 2 is 780 base pairs long and consists of five exons. PRR36 Transcript Variant 2 theoretically encodes a protein 260 amino acids in length. However, it is currently suspected that this variant transcript never gets translated.

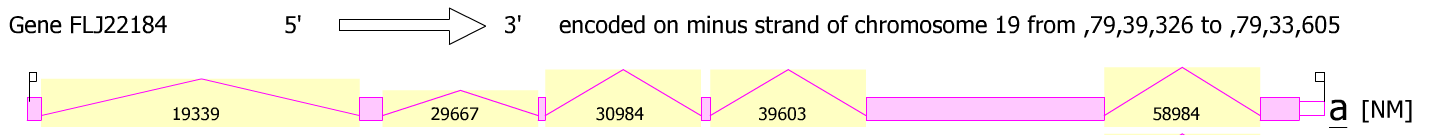
Splicing of FLJ22184/PRR36 gene for transcript variant 1

PRR36 Transcript Variant 1 has only been found to have only one polyadenylation site.

== Protein ==
=== Domain and motifs ===
DUF4596 on human PRP36 is 47 amino acids long, has an isoelectric point of 3.77, and is almost completely conserved across mammals. Despite lacking a signal peptide, PRP36 is predicted to be excreted from the cell after it undergoes processing.

A few different tandem repeats, separated repeats, and repeated sequences exist throughout PRP36. These repeats are observable in primate PRP36 orthologs but are absent in PRP36 orthologs from more distantly related species such as the opossum, suggesting that some form of evolution has been occurring throughout the PRP36 sequence in relatively recent history.

Multiple sequence alignment of the DUF4596 Region across 20 PRP36 Orthologs. Green indicates complete conservation, blue identical residues, and magenta chemical similarity.

=== Composition ===
PRP36 is 1346 amino acids long and is proline rich, meaning that a greater proportion of proline residues exist throughout the protein, including the DUF4596 domain, in comparison with other human proteins. Proline rich proteins are often observed to be intrinsically unstructured and have been connected with protein-protein interactions in signaling pathways. However, it isn't certain whether these traits hold true in PRP36. In PRP36 the amino acids isoleucine, tyrosine, and asparagine are present at a decreased proportion compared to a typical human protein. Two highly positive sequences exist towards the N terminus of PRP36 while a highly negative sequence exists within the DUF4596 domains towards the C terminus. As a whole, however, PRP36 appears to be a slightly basic and overall positively charged protein, as it has a corresponding isoelectric point of 10.98. PRP36 is a polar and soluble protein.

=== Post-translational modifications ===
PRP36 is predicted to contain 24 phosphorylation sites in humans, including 14 serine, 9 threonine, and 1 tyrosine site. Additionally, there are 8 predicted N-Acetylglucosamine attachment sites and 2 highly conserved predicted SUMOylation sites.

=== Secondary structure ===
PRP36 secondary structure has not been explicitly determined, but predictions based on the PRR36 mRNA give some possibilities. Alpha-helixes, beta sheets, and other structure characteristics fail to be conserved across PRP36 orthologs with the exception of an alpha-helix alpha-helix beta-strand beta-strand motif that was highly conserved across mammals. This motif begins slightly before and carries into the DUF4596 region, suggesting a high importance for this domain in PRP36 function.

=== Interacting proteins ===
STRING predicted protein interactions for human PRP36.

PRP36 has medium scores for predicted interaction with two other proteins of unknown function, OVCH1 and FAM179A. These predictions, however, have not been experimentally determined, so the confidence of protein-protein interaction with PRP36 isn't very high.

=== Cellular location ===
Phobius predicted protein location for human PRP36.

No signal peptide or other marker is predicted to exist with the PRP36 sequence. However, according to Phobius, PRP36 is predicted to be a non-cytoplasmic protein existing the extracellular space. Assuming this prediction is correct, this might indicate that PRP36 undergoes unconventional protein secretion.

== Expression ==
=== Promoter ===
A single promoter is predicted to exist by Genomatix for the PRP36 protein. This promoter exists on the negative strand from position 7939226 to 7939826 and is 601 base pairs in length. The PRP36 promoter region contains a number of predicted transcription factors of various types including various zinc fingers, E2F factors, and CDF factors. Of particulate note is the presence of a XGene Promoter Element on the minus strand which is a mediator of RNA polymerase II for promoters lacking a TATA box, as is the case for the PRP36 promoter. The following table gives 12 transcription factors that interact with PRP36 as predicted by the ElDorado tool from Genomatix—all shown factors received a minimum Matrix Sim score of 0.877.

Matrix Family	Detailed Matrix Information	Detailed Family Information	Start Position	End Position	Anchor Position	Strand	Sequence
O$XCPE	X gene core promoter element 1	Activator-, mediator- and TBP-dependent core promoter element for RNA polymerase II transcription from TATA-less promoters	513	523	518	+	ggGCGGgaccg
V$ZF5F	ZF5 POZ domain zinc finger, zinc finger protein 161	ZF5 POZ domain zinc finger	477	491	484	+	gagcgCGCGcccccg
V$GLIF	GLIS family zinc finger 2	GLI zinc finger family	16	32	24	+	tcgaCCCCccaaccaga
V$ZF02	Zinc finger and BTB domain containing 7A, Pokémon	C2H2 zinc finger transcription factors 2	550	572	561	+	gcagcCCCCtcccctcgcctcct
V$E2FF	E2F transcription factor 6	E2F-myc activator/cell cycle regulator	490	506	498	-	cgcggGCGGgagagccg
V$E2FF	E2F transcription factor 2	E2F-myc activator/cell cycle regulator	476	492	484	+	cgagcGCGCgcccccgg
V$SP1F	Sp2, member of the Sp/XKLF transcription factors with three C2H2 zinc fingers in a conserved carboxyl-terminal domain	GC-Box factors SP1/GC	189	205	197	-	ccaggaggcgGGACcac
V$MAZF	Myc associated zinc finger protein (MAZ)	Myc associated zinc fingers	557	569	563	-	aggcGAGGggagg
V$E2FF	E2F transcription factor 2	E2F-myc activator/cell cycle regulator	411	427	419	+	ccaaaGCGCgcttctcc
O$XCPE	X gene core promoter element 1	Activator-, mediator- and TBP-dependent core promoter element for RNA polymerase II transcription from TATA-less promoters	493	503	498	-	ggGCGGgagag
V$E2FF	E2F transcription factor 3	E2F-myc activator/cell cycle regulator	475	491	483	-	cggggGCGCgcgctcga
O$XCPE	X gene core promoter element 1	Activator-, mediator- and TBP-dependent core promoter element for RNA polymerase II transcription from TATA-less promoters	190	200	195	-	agGCGGgacca

=== Expression ===
Unigene's EST cDNA Tissue Abundance display and Protein Atlas shows PRP36 as having significant expression levels in the brain, embryonic tissue, eyes, intestines, kidneys, nerves, and ovaries. Additional evidence supports some of these findings, as analysis of normal tissues revealed that over 50% of the cells in the cerebellum, fetal brain, prefrontal cortex, and superior cervical ganglion expressed PRP36. PRP36 appears to be over-expressed in cell samples taken from patients with ductal carcinomas of the mammary gland, suggesting that the disease state and PRP36 expression might be connected.

Unigene EST tissue expression data for human PRP36 protein

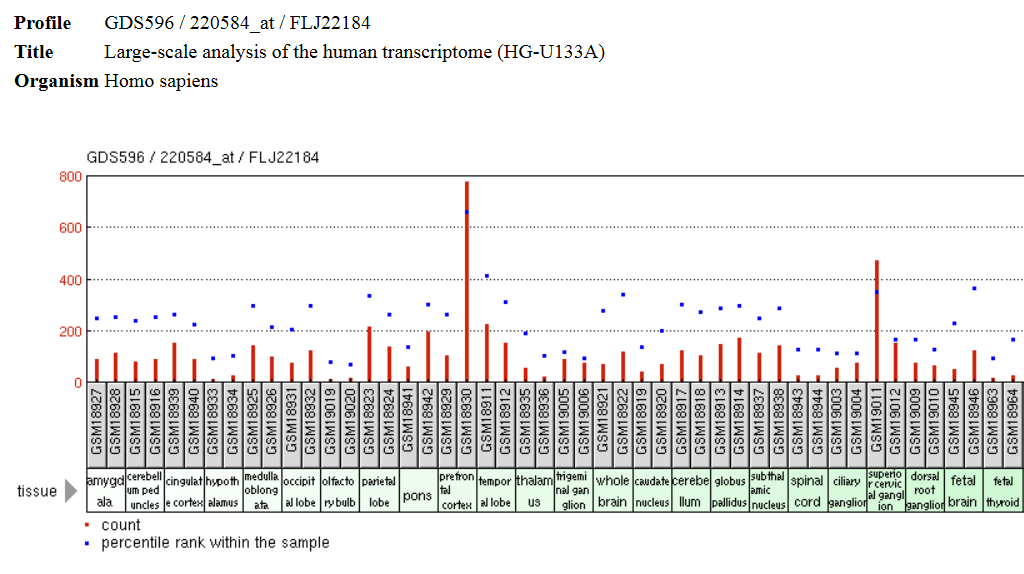
PRP36 Protein Presence in a Human Transcriptome Analysis.

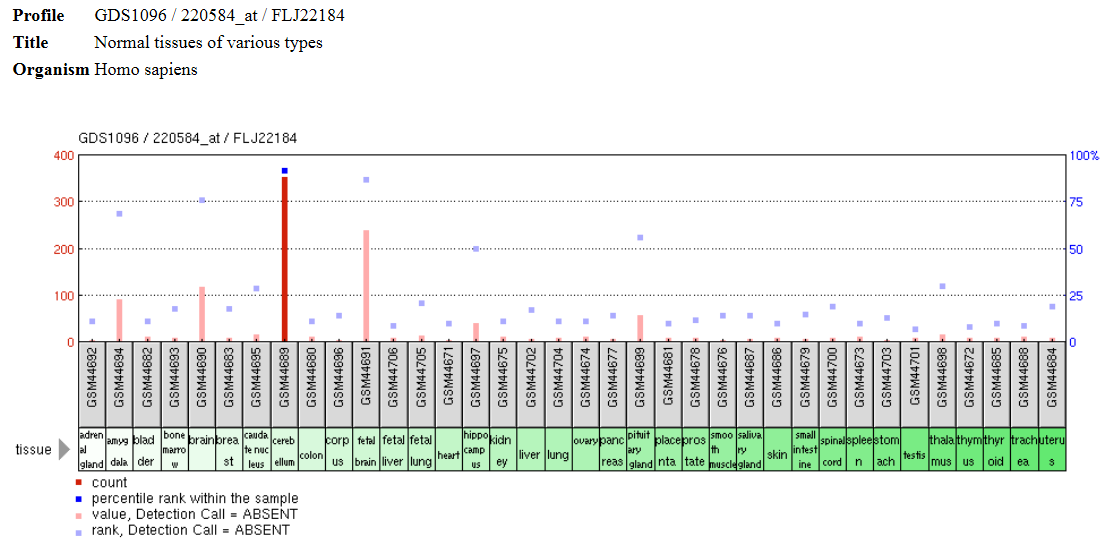
PRP36 Protein Presence in Normal Tissue Analysis.

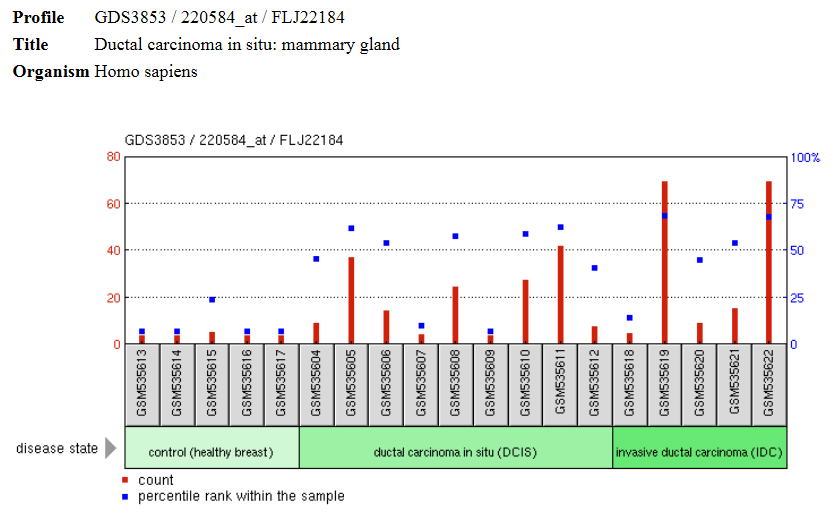
PRP36 Protein Presence in cells of a Ductal Carcinoma of the Mammary Gland.

== Homology ==
=== Orthologs ===
PRP36 has no known paralogs in humans, but a number of orthologs were found to exist in species throughout the mammalian kingdom. PRP36 is highly conserved across primates, but a few short sequences unique to the human version of the gene do exist. Based on the lack of conservation across all mammals a rapid evolution for PRP36 can be suggested. However, the DUF4596 region is highly conserved across mammals, suggesting that the domain is critical to PRP36 function while the rest of protein is more easily manipulated without leading to harm. A list of orthologs for PRP36 can be found below

#	Genus and species	Common name	Divergence (MYA)	Accession number	E-value	Length (aa)	Identity (%)	Similarity (%)
1	Homo sapiens	Human	0	NP_001177396	0	1346	100	100
2	Pan troglodytes	Chimpanzee	6.3	XP_009432808	0	1280	87	88
3	Callithrix jacchus	Marmoset	42.6	XP_008985368	0	1243	78	79
4	Saimiri boliviensis boliviensis	Black-capped squirrel monkey	42.6	XP_010347967.1	0	1161	75	77
5	Otolemur garnetti	Northern greater galago	74.0	XP_003793753	5x10^{-158}	1084	59	64
6	Mesocricetus auratus	Golden hamster	92.3	XP_005085339	2x10^{-106}	1034	82	86
7	Mus musculus	House mouse	92.3	XP_006508977	6x10^{-104}	1046	67	71
8	Nannospalax galili	Upper Galilee Mountains blind mole-rat	92.3	XP_008822351.1	1x10^{-117}	1167	62	65
9	Jaculus jaculus	Lesser Egyptian jerboa	92.3	XP_004672230	1x10^{-123}	1007	55	59
10	Ictidomys tridecemlineatus	Thirteen-lined ground squirrel	92.3	XP_005332306.1	1x10^{-111}	826	58	65
11	Bubalus bubalis	Water buffalo	94.2	XP_006046812	5x10^{-119}	1068	75	77
12	Felis catus	House cat	94.2	XP_011287775	2x10^{-89}	668	73	77
13	Camelus dromedarius	Dromedary	94.2	XP_010976676.1	4x10^{-119}	868	65	70
14	Myotis lucifugus	Little brown bat	94.2	XP_006101945.1	4x10^{-111}	935	58	63
15	Balaenoptera acutorostrata scammoni	Common minke whale	94.2	XP_007169287.1	7x10^{-132}	684	62	67
16	Bison bison bison	American bison	94.2	XP_010826582	8x10^{-101}	1054	51	58
17	Vicugna pacos	Alpaca	94.2	XP_006206574	8x10^{-64}	680	51	56
18	Echinops telfairi	Lesser hedgehog tenrec	98.7	XP_004717416	2x10^{-96}	850	61	65
19	Trichechus manatus latirostris	Florida manatee	98.7	XP_004378653.1	4x10^{-114}	879	59	63
20	Monodelphis domestica	Gray short-tailed opossum	162.6	XP_007489701.1	4x10^{-85}	653	48	54

=== Evolution ===
Multiple sequence alignment suggests that PRP36 evolved early in mammalian lineage. Mammals very distantly related to human beings, such as the opossum, have a version of the PRP36, suggesting that the protein came about prior to that evolutionary divergence. However, with exception to the DUF4596 domain, very few areas within the PRP36 sequence are conserved.

== Clinical significance ==
At this time, the function of the PRP36 protein is not known. However, some speculation of the function can be made. In 2009, it was discovered that the source of a patient's phenotypes was a genetic condition involving a 19p13.2 microdeletion—a very small piece of chromosome was missing from the patient (the entire 19p13.2 region was not missing). Additional diagnoses have since been made, and a few patients have been found to have microdeltions that involve the region in which the PRR36 gene is found, meaning the PRP36 protein would not be found in these individuals. However, this region also included other genes whose functions are well known; for example the obesity observed in the patients can be traced to the deletion of the insulin receptor gene. Other symptoms, such a learning disabilities and speech impediments can be tied to similar gene deletions. However, it is possible that PRP36 absence causes a minor disability that is masked by these other symptoms. Additionally, it is possible that PRP36 plays a secondary role with one or more of these other deleted genes. This second option can be slightly supported by noting that other proline rich proteins that have known function, both on human chromosome 19 and other chromosomes, tend to more frequently produce proteins that are involved in protein-protein interactions than many other general types of genes.
