= EVI5L =

Protein-coding gene in the species Homo sapiens

Identifiers
- Aliases: EVI5L, ecotropic viral integration site 5 like
- External IDs: GeneCards: EVI5L

Gene location (Human)
Chr.	Chromosome 19 (human)
Band	19p13.2	Start	7,830,218 bp
Band	19p13.2	End	7,864,976 bp
RNA expression pattern
Bgee	Human / Mouse (ortholog); Top expressed in: prefrontal cortex; right frontal lobe; cingulate gyrus; anterior cingulate cortex; amygdala; C1 segment; hypothalamus; Brodmann area 9; substantia nigra; putamen / n/a; More reference expression data
BioGPS	n/a
Gene ontology
Molecular function	protein binding; GTPase activator activity
Cellular component	endomembrane system; intracellular anatomical structure; membrane; integral component of membrane
Biological process	negative regulation of cilium assembly; activation of GTPase activity; intracellular protein transport; regulation of vesicle fusion; positive regulation of GTPase activity; regulation of GTPase activity
Sources:Amigo / QuickGO
Orthologs
Databases	NCBI: entry; OMA: entry
Species	Human	Mouse
Entrez	115704	n/a
Ensembl	ENSG00000142459	n/a
UniProt	Q96CN4	n/a
RefSeq (mRNA)	NM_001159944; NM_145245	n/a
RefSeq (protein)	NP_001153416; NP_660288	n/a
Location (UCSC)	Chr 19: 7.83 – 7.86 Mb	n/a
PubMed search		n/a
- Wikidata
View/Edit Human

EVI5L (Ecotropic Viral Integration Site 5-Like) is a protein that in humans is encoded by the EVI5L gene. EVI5L is a member of the Ras superfamily of monomeric guanine nucleotide-binding (G) proteins, and functions as a GTPase-activating protein (GAP) with a broad specificity. Measurement of in vitro Rab-GAP activity has shown that EVI5L has significant Rab2A- and Rab10-GAP activity.

== Gene ==
The EVI5L gene is 34,701 base pairs long and has an unprocessed mRNA that is 3,756 nucleotides in length. It consists of 19 exons that encode for an 805 amino acid protein.

Relative location of EVI5L on the short arm of Chromosome 19

=== Locus ===
EVI5L is located on the short arm (p) of chromosome 19 in region 1, band 3, and sub-band 2 (19p13.2) starting at 7,830,275 base pairs and ending at 7,864,976 base pairs. It is encoded for on the plus strand. It is located near the CLEC4M (C-type lectin domain family 4, member M) gene, which is involved in peptide antigen transport.

== Homology and evolution ==
=== Homologous domains ===
EVI5L contains a RAB-GAP TBC domain, which is involved with regulating membrane trafficking by cycling between inactive (GDP-bound) and active (GTP-bound) conformations. It also has the apolipophorin-III and tetratricopeptide repeat (TPR) domains. Apolipophorin-III play vital roles in the transport of lipids and lipoprotein metabolism, while TPR mediates protein-protein interactions and the assembly of multi protein complexes. These three domains are highly conserved in EVI5L orthologs.

=== Paralogs ===
There are 7 moderately related proteins in humans that are paralogous to the RAB-GAP TBC domain of EVI5L. All of these proteins are in the guanosine nucleotide-binding protein family

Paralogs of EVI5L
Paralogous Protein	Protein Name	Sequence length (amino acids)	Amino Acid Identity
EVI5	Ecotropic viral integration site 5	810 aa	51%
TBC1D14	TBC1 domain family, member 14	693 aa	19%
RABGAP1	RAB GTPase activating protein 1	1069 aa	18%
RABGAP1L	RAB GTPase activating protein 1-like	815 aa	18%
TBC1D12	TBC1 Domain Family Member 12	775 aa	17%
TBC1	(Tre-2/USP6, BUB2, Cdc16) Domain Family, Member 1	1168 aa	15%
TBC1D4	TBC1 domain family, member 4	1298 aa	13%

=== Orthologs ===
There are 63 orthologs of EVI5L that have been identified including mammals, birds, reptiles, and fish. EVI5L is highly conserved among its orthologs but is not present in insects, plants, bacteria, archea or protists.

=== Homologs ===
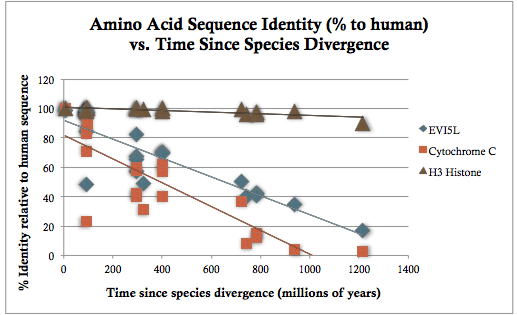
Amino acid sequence identity vs. time since species divergence for orthologs of EVI5L. It is seen that EVI5L has moderate/fast evolution rate when compared to Cytochrome C and H3 histone.

The following table lists the homologs of EVI5L:

Genus and Species	Common name	Accession number	Seq. Length	Seq. Identity	Seq. Similarity	Time of Divergence
Homo sapiens	Humans	NM_001159944.2	3756 bp	-	-	-
Pan troglodytes	Common Chimpanzee	XM_003316056.2	3874 bp	99%	99%	6.3 mya
Canis familiaris	Dog	XM_003432793.1	2430 bp	98%	99%	94.2 mya
Sus scrofa	Wild Boar	XM_003123194	3673 bp	95%	99%	94.2 mya
Chelonia mydas	Sea Turtle	EMP36617	3436 bp	94%	99%	294.5 mya
Alligator sinensis	Chinese Alligator	XM_006036467.1	6780 bp	82%	91%	296.4 mya
Ficedula albicollis	Collared Flycatcher	XM_005062373.1	2090 bp	79%	88%	324.2 mya
Haplochromis burtoni	Cichlid	XM_005934450.1	6638 bp	70%	84%	400.1 mya
Danio rerio	Zebrafish	XM_689590	2856 bp	69%	82%	400.1 mya
Oreochromis niloticus	Nile Tilapia	XM_003447957	6757 bp	68%	84%	400.1 mya

== Protein ==
The protein of EVI5L consists of 805 amino acid residues. The molecular weight of the mature protein is 92.5 kdal with an isoelectric point of 5.05. EVI5L has an unusually large amount of glutamic acid residues, compared to similar proteins. Most of the protein is neutral, with no positive charge, negative charge, or mixed charge clusters. It has a very small negative hydrophobicity (-0.597019). EVI5L is a soluble protein that localizes in the nucleus. It contains no signal peptide, no mitochondrial targeting motifs and no peroxisomal targeting signal in the C-terminus. There is no transmembrane domain in EVI5L.

=== Isoforms ===
EVI5L has two isoforms produced by alternative splicing. Isoform 2 is missing in-frame exon 11, making it shorter (794 amino acids).

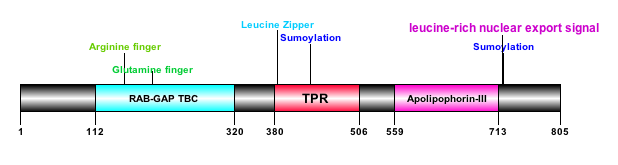
Important domains and post-translational modifications of EVI5L

=== Post-translational modifications ===
Post translational modifications of EVI5L that are evolutionarily conserved in majority of the orthologs include glycosylation (C-mannosylation), glycation, phosphorylation (non-kinase and kinase specific), and sumoylation. There is also one leucine-rich nuclear export signal.

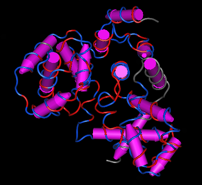
Highly conserved regions of RAB-GAP1L correspond to the RAB-GAP TBC domain in EVI5L. The conserved regions are next to each other, and form a pocket for possible interactions with RAB2A and RAB10. There are no beta-sheets present, just alpha helices.

=== Secondary structure ===
The entire secondary structure of EVI5L is made up of alpha helices, with no beta sheets present. This is also true for EVI5Ls closest structural paralog, RABGAP1L.

== Expression ==
=== Promoter ===
The predicted promoter for the EVI5L gene spans 664 base pairs from 7,910,867 to 7,911,530 with a predicted transcriptional start site that is 114 base pairs and spans from 7,911,346 to 7,911,460. The promoter region and beginning of the EVI5L gene (7,910,997 to 7,911,843) is not conserved past primates. This region was used to determine transcription factor interactions.

Some of the main transcription factors predicted to bind to the promoter includes: activator-, mediator- and TBP-dependent core promoter element for RNA polymerase II transcription from TATA-less promoters, p53 tumor suppressor, brachyury gene, mesoderm developmental factor, EGR/nerve growth factor induced protein C & related factors, and GLI zinc finger family.

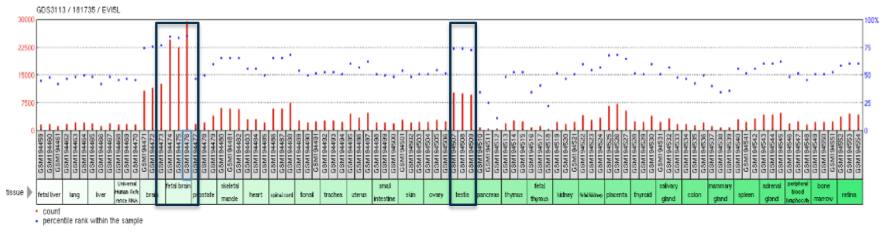
EVI5L has ubiquitously low expression, with slightly higher expression in the testis and fetal brain.

=== Expression ===
Expression data from expressed sequence tag mapping, microarray and in situ hybridization shows EVI5L has ubiquitously low expression. However, it has slightly higher expression in the testis and fetal brain.

== Function and biochemistry ==
The exact function of EVI5L is unknown. Given this, the paralogs of the gene are associated with starvation-induced autophagosome formation and trafficking and translocation of GLUT4-containing vesicles. Therefore, EVI5L is predicted to target endocytic vesicles.

== Interacting proteins ==
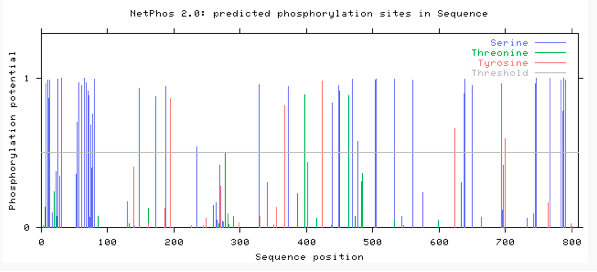
SRPK2 phosphorylates the serine residues of EVI5L

EVI5L has been shown to interact with NUDT18 (nucleoside diphosphate linked moiety X)-type motif 18 and SRPK2 (serine/threonine-protein kinase 2). NUDT18 is a member of the Nudix hydrolase family. Nudix hydrolases eliminate potentially toxic nucleotide metabolites from the cell and regulate the concentrations and availability of many different nucleotide substrates, cofactors, and signaling molecules. SRPK2 is a Serine/arginine rich protein-specific kinase which specifically phosphorylates its substrates at serine residues located in regions rich in arginine/serine dipeptides, known as RS domains and is involved in the phosphorylation of SR splicing factors and the regulation of splicing.

== Clinical significance ==
Zebrafish deficient for Rab23 or its GTPase-activating protein, EVI5L, exhibit abnormal heart formation. This is attributed to the requirement of RAB23 in the differentiation of cardiac progenitor cells. RAB23 is required for normal development of the brain, spinal cord and heart, and without EVI5L to activate RAB23, abnormal formation of these organs ensues.
