= Apoc =

Apoc may refer to:

- African Programme for Onchocerciasis Control, a World Bank and World Health Organization NGO
- Apolipoprotein C, a family of four proteins that resides on lipoproteins.
- Anglo-Persian Oil Company, later BP
- Anarchist People of Color
- APOC (wrestler) is the ring name of a professional wrestler.
- Apoc, a character in the Matrix series
- Assistant production office coordinator, a film and television administrative job
