= Apolipoprotein F =

Protein-coding gene in the species Homo sapiens

Identifiers
- Symbol: APOF
- Pfam: PF15148
- InterPro: IPR026114
Available protein structures:
- PDB: IPR026114 PF15148 (ECOD; PDBsum)
- AlphaFold: IPR026114; PF15148

An Error has occurred retrieving Wikidata item for infobox

Apolipoprotein F is a protein that in humans is encoded for by the APOF gene. The product of this gene is one of the minor apolipoproteins found in plasma. This protein forms complexes with lipoproteins and may be involved in transport and/or esterification of cholesterol.
