= Apolipoprotein M =

Protein-coding gene in the species Homo sapiens

APOM
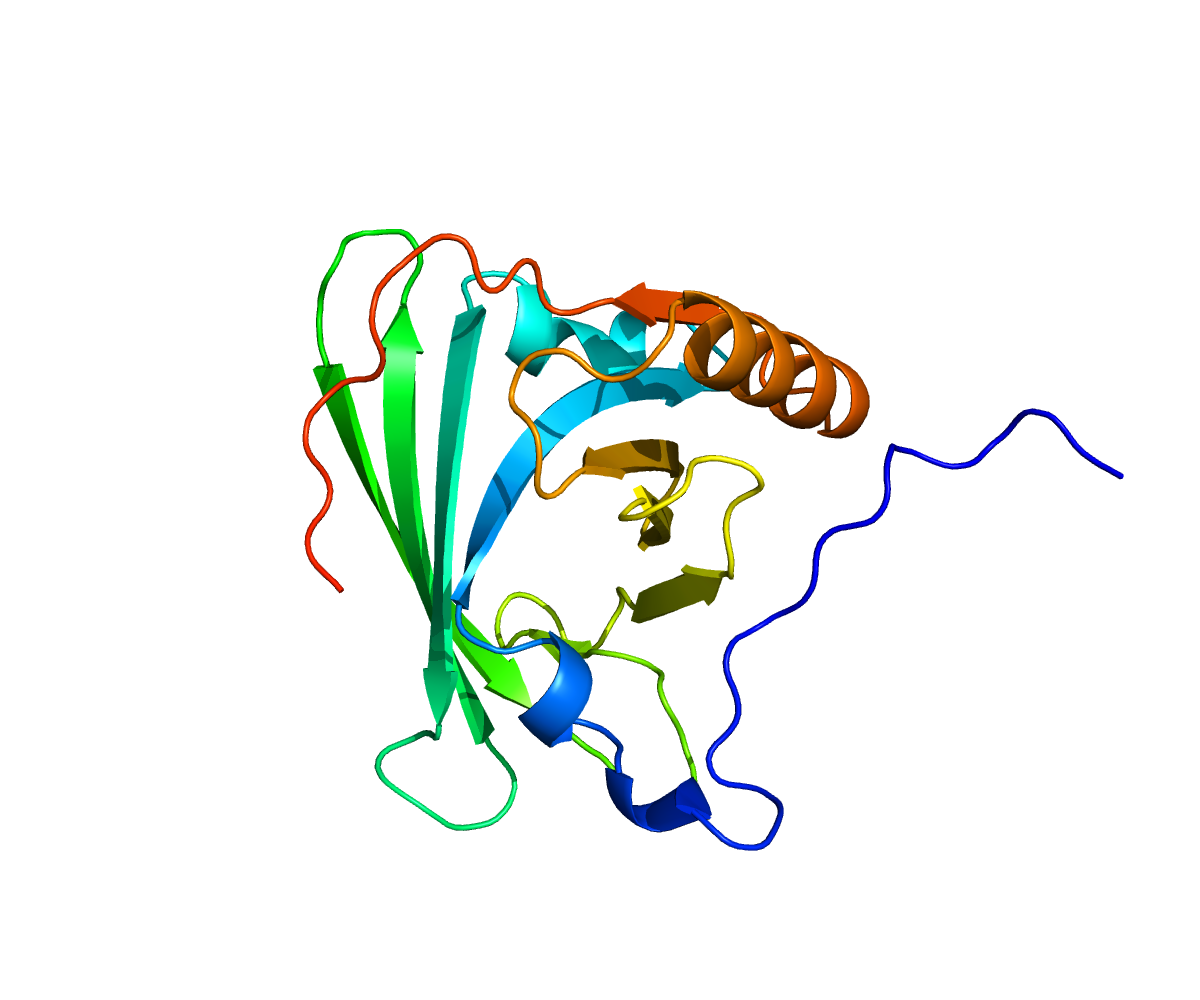

Identifiers
- Aliases: APOM, G3a, HSPC336, NG20, apo-M, apolipoprotein M
- External IDs: OMIM: 606907; MGI: 1930124; GeneCards: APOM
Available structures
PDB	Ortholog search: PDBe RCSB
PDB	List of PDB id codes 2WEW, 2WEX, 2YG2

Gene location (Human)
Chr.	Chromosome 6 (human)
Band	6p21.33	Start	31,652,416 bp
Band	6p21.33	End	31,658,210 bp

Gene location (Mouse)
Chr.	Chromosome 17 (mouse)
Band	17|17 B1	Start	35,347,973 bp
Band	17|17 B1	End	35,351,026 bp
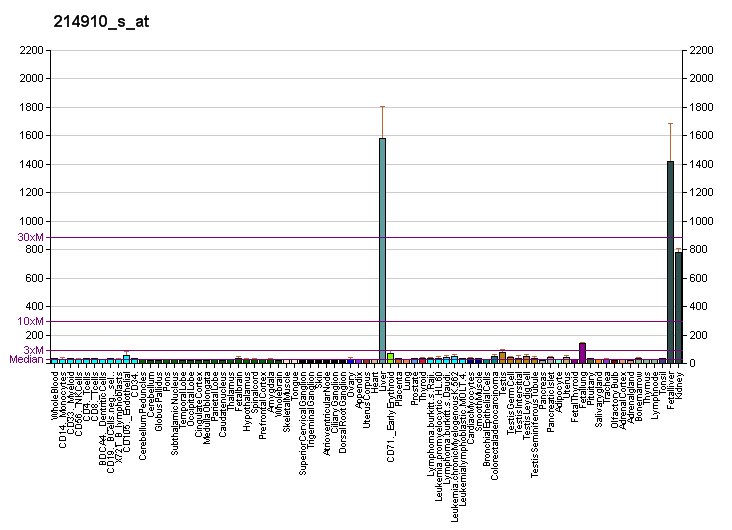

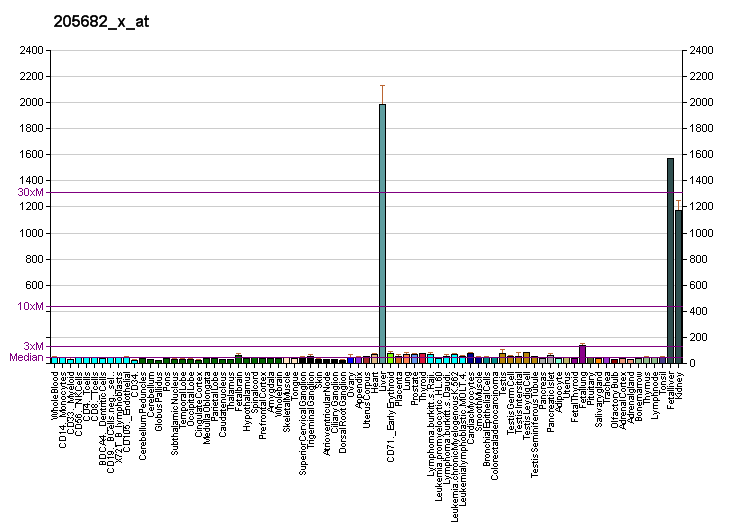
RNA expression pattern
Bgee	Human / Mouse (ortholog); Top expressed in: right lobe of liver; human kidney; gonad; renal cortex; testicle; left testis; right testis; olfactory zone of nasal mucosa; gastrocnemius muscle; bone marrow / Top expressed in: yolk sac; left lobe of liver; right kidney; human fetus; human kidney; proximal tubule; primitive streak; fetal liver hematopoietic progenitor cell; abdominal wall; blastocyst; More reference expression data
BioGPS	More reference expression data
Gene ontology
Molecular function	lipid transporter activity; antioxidant activity; phospholipid binding
Cellular component	discoidal high-density lipoprotein particle; integral component of plasma membrane; very-low-density lipoprotein particle; spherical high-density lipoprotein particle; extracellular region; low-density lipoprotein particle; high-density lipoprotein particle; extracellular space
Biological process	lipoprotein metabolic process; lipid transport; negative regulation of plasma lipoprotein oxidation; response to glucose; high-density lipoprotein particle assembly; retinoid metabolic process; high-density lipoprotein particle remodeling; cholesterol efflux; cholesterol homeostasis; reverse cholesterol transport; high-density lipoprotein particle clearance; cellular oxidant detoxification
Sources:Amigo / QuickGO
Orthologs
Databases	NCBI: entry; OMA: entry
Species	Human	Mouse
Entrez	55937	55938
Ensembl	ENSG00000231974; ENSG00000204444; ENSG00000206409; ENSG00000227567; ENSG00000235754 ENSG00000224290; ENSG00000226215	ENSMUSG00000024391
UniProt	O95445	Q9Z1R3
RefSeq (mRNA)	NM_001256169; NM_019101	NM_018816
RefSeq (protein)	NP_001243098; NP_061974	NP_061286
Location (UCSC)	Chr 6: 31.65 – 31.66 Mb	Chr 17: 35.35 – 35.35 Mb
PubMed search
- Wikidata
View/Edit Human	View/Edit Mouse

ApoM

Identifiers
- Symbol: ApoM
- Pfam: PF11032
- Pfam clan: CL0116
- InterPro: IPR022734
Available protein structures:
- PDB: IPR022734 PF11032 (ECOD; PDBsum)
- AlphaFold: IPR022734; PF11032

Apolipoprotein M is an apolipoprotein and member of the lipocalin protein family that in humans is encoded by the APOM gene. It is found associated with high density lipoproteins and to a lesser extent with low density lipoproteins and triglyceride-rich lipoproteins. The encoded protein is secreted through the plasma membrane but remains membrane-bound, where it is involved in lipid transport. Two transcript variants encoding two different isoforms have been found for this gene, but only one of them has been fully characterized. It lacks an external amphipathic motif and is uniquely secreted to plasma without cleavage of its terminal signal peptide. The average molecular weight is 21253 Da, and the monoisotopic molecular weight is 21239 Da.
