= Apolipoprotein A-V =

Protein-coding gene in humans

APOA5

Identifiers
- Aliases: APOA5, APOAV, RAP3, apolipoprotein A5
- External IDs: OMIM: 606368; MGI: 1913363; GeneCards: APOA5

Gene location (Human)
Chr.	Chromosome 11 (human)
Band	11q23.3	Start	116,789,367 bp
Band	11q23.3	End	116,792,420 bp

Gene location (Mouse)
Chr.	Chromosome 9 (mouse)
Band	9|9 A5.2	Start	46,179,931 bp
Band	9|9 A5.2	End	46,183,217 bp
RNA expression pattern
Bgee	Human / Mouse (ortholog); Top expressed in: right lobe of liver; body of pancreas; gonad; intestinal epithelium; urinary system; blood; wall of uterus; hippocampal formation; kidney; myometrium / Top expressed in: left lobe of liver; gallbladder; yolk sac; sexually immature organism; embryo; embryo; Ileal epithelium; medial head of gastrocnemius muscle; cingulate gyrus; thoracic diaphragm; More reference expression data
BioGPS	n/a
Gene ontology
Molecular function	heparin binding; lipoprotein particle receptor binding; phosphatidylcholine binding; lipoprotein lipase activator activity; lipase binding; lipase activator activity; low-density lipoprotein particle receptor binding; cholesterol binding; enzyme binding; enzyme activator activity; phosphatidylcholine-sterol O-acyltransferase activator activity; phospholipid binding; cholesterol transfer activity; lipid binding
Cellular component	blood microparticle; chylomicron; very-low-density lipoprotein particle; extracellular region; low-density lipoprotein particle; high-density lipoprotein particle; extracellular space; endoplasmic reticulum lumen
Biological process	neuron projection regeneration; positive regulation of receptor-mediated endocytosis; lipid transport; positive regulation of triglyceride catabolic process; tissue regeneration; positive regulation of cholesterol esterification; phospholipid efflux; positive regulation of lipid catabolic process; positive regulation of lipoprotein lipase activity; high-density lipoprotein particle assembly; positive regulation of fatty acid biosynthetic process; triglyceride catabolic process; regulation of intestinal cholesterol absorption; cholesterol efflux; cholesterol biosynthetic process; cholesterol homeostasis; acylglycerol homeostasis; positive regulation of very-low-density lipoprotein particle remodeling; phosphatidylcholine metabolic process; triglyceride metabolic process; triglyceride-rich lipoprotein particle remodeling; triglyceride homeostasis; reverse cholesterol transport; regulation of lipid metabolic process; lipoprotein metabolic process; post-translational protein modification; regulation of cholesterol transport; very-low-density lipoprotein particle remodeling; positive regulation of lipid biosynthetic process
Sources:Amigo / QuickGO
Orthologs
Databases	NCBI: entry; OMA: entry
Species	Human	Mouse
Entrez	116519	66113
Ensembl	ENSG00000110243	ENSMUSG00000032079
UniProt	Q6Q788	Q8C7G5
RefSeq (mRNA)	NM_052968; NM_001166598; NM_001371904	NM_080434; NM_001348095
RefSeq (protein)	NP_001160070; NP_443200; NP_001358833	NP_536682; NP_001335024
Location (UCSC)	Chr 11: 116.79 – 116.79 Mb	Chr 9: 46.18 – 46.18 Mb
PubMed search
- Wikidata
View/Edit Human	View/Edit Mouse

Apolipoprotein A-V is a protein that in humans is encoded by the APOA5 gene on chromosome 11. It is significantly expressed in liver. The protein encoded by this gene is an apolipoprotein and an important determinant of plasma triglyceride levels, a major risk factor for coronary artery disease. It is a component of several lipoprotein fractions including VLDL, HDL, chylomicrons. It is believed that apoA-V affects lipoprotein metabolism by interacting with LDL-R gene family receptors. Considering its association with lipoprotein levels, APOA5 is implicated in metabolic syndrome. The APOA5 gene also contains one of 27 SNPs associated with increased risk of coronary artery disease.

== Discovery ==
The gene for apolipoprotein A5 (APOA5, gene ID 116519, OMIM accession number – 606368) was originally found by comparative sequencing of human and mice DNA as a last member of the gene cluster of apolipoproteins APOA1/APOC3/APOA4/APOA5, located on human chromosome 11 at position 11q23. The creation of two mice models (APOA5 transgenic and APOA5 knock-out) confirmed the important role of this gene in plasma triglyceride determination. The transgenic mice had lower and the knock-out mice higher levels of plasma triglycerides, while plasma cholesterol levels remained unchanged in both animal models. A Dutch group simultaneously described an identical gene as apolipoprotein which it is associated with the early phase of liver regeneration, but failed to recognise its important role in the determination of plasma triglyceride levels.

== Structure ==
=== Gene ===
The APOA5 gene resides on chromosome 11 at the band 11q23 and contains 4 exons and 3 introns. This gene uses alternate polyadenylation sites and is located proximal to the apolipoprotein gene cluster on chromosome 11q23.

=== Protein ===
This protein belongs to the apolipoprotein A1/A4/E family and contains 2 coiled coil domains. Overall, APOA5 is predicted to have approximately 60% a-helical content. The mature APOA5 protein spans a length of 366 amino acid residues, of which 23 amino acids code for the signal peptide. The molecular mass of the precursor was calculated to be 41 kDa, while the mature APOA5 protein was calculated to be 39 kDa.

== Tissue distribution ==
In humans, APOA5 is expressed almost exclusively in the liver tissue; some minor expressions have also been detected in the small intestine. Nothing is known about the existence of the potential alternative splicing variants of this gene. In comparison with other apolipoproteins, plasma concentration of APOA5 is very low (less than 1 μg/mL). This suggests that it has more catalytic than structural functions, since there is less than one APOA5 molecule per one lipoprotein particle. APOA5 is associated predominantly with TG-rich lipoproteins (chylomicrons and VLDL) and has also been detected on HDL particles.

== Function ==
APOA5 mainly functions to influence plasma triglyceride levels. The first suggested mechanism supposes that APOA5 functions as an activator of lipoprotein lipase (which is a key enzyme in triglyceride catabolism) and, through this process, enhances the metabolism of TG-rich particles. The second is the possible effect of APOA5 on the secretion of VLDL particles, since APOA5 reduces hepatic production by inhibiting VLDL-particle production and assembly by binding to cellular membranes and lipids. Finally, the third possibility relates to the acceleration of the hepatic uptake of lipoprotein remnants and it has been shown that APOA5 binds to different members of the low-density lipoprotein receptor family. In addition to its TG-lowering effect, APOA5 also plays a significant role in modulating HDL maturation and cholesterol metabolism. Increased APOA5 levels were associated with skewed cholesterol distribution from VLDL to large HDL particles. APOA5 mRNA is upregulated during liver regeneration and this suggests that APOA5 serves a function in hepatocyte proliferation. It's also reported that APOA5 could enhance insulin secretion in beta-cells and the cell surface midkine could be involved in APOA5 endocytosis.

== Gene variability ==
Within the APOA5 gene, a couple of important SNPs with a widely confirmed effect on plasma TG levels as well as rare mutations have been described. In Caucasians, the common variants are inherited mostly in three haplotypes, which are characterised by two SNPs, namely rs662799 (T-1131>C; in almost complete LD with A-3>G, where the minor allele is associated with about 50% lower gene expression) and rs3135506 (Ser19>Trp; C56>G; alters the signal peptide and influences APOA5 secretion into plasma). There are also a further three common variants (A-3>G, IVS+476 G>A and T1259>C) which are not necessary for haplotype characterisation. Population frequencies of common APOA5 alleles exhibit large interethnic differences. For example, there are about 15% of carriers of the rs66299(C) allele among Caucasians, but the frequency could reach even between 40% and 50% among Asians. In contrast, the Trp19 allele is very rare in the Asian population (less than 1% of carriers) but is common in Caucasians (about 15% of carriers). Vice versa, important SNP (rs2075291, G553T, Gly185>Cys) with a population frequency of about 5% has been detected among Asians, but it is extremely rare among Caucasians. Sporadic publications refer to some other common polymorphisms, e.g. Val153>Met (rs3135507, G457A) and also suggest significant sex-dependent associations with plasma lipids. Rare variants within the APOA5 gene have been described in a couple of different populations. Among the "common mutations/rare SNPs", one of the most characterised on a population level is the Ala315>Val exchange. Originally detected in patients with extreme TG levels over 10 mmol/L, it was also found in about 0.7% of the general population (mostly in individuals with normal TG values), which suggests a low penetrance of this variant. More than twenty other rare variants (mutations) have been described within the human APOA5 gene. They cover a wide spectrum that includes premature stop codons, amino acid changes as well as insertions and deletions. These mutations are generally associated with hypertriglyceridaemia, but penetration is usually not 100%. Individual mutations have been found mostly in one pedigree only.

Not all the SNPs have a detrimental effect on TG levels. A recent report, showed that, in the Sardinian population, the missense mutation Arg282Ser in the APOA5 gene correlates with a decrease in TG levels. The authors believe that this point mutation is a major modulator of TG values in this population.

== Clinical significance ==
In humans, plasma triglycerides such as triacylglycerols have been long debated as an important risk factor for not only cardiovascular disease but also for other relevant morbidities, such as cancer, renal disease, suicide, and all-cause mortality. The APOA5 gene was found by comparative sequencing of ~200 kbp of human and mice DNA as the last member of the gene cluster of apolipoproteins located on human chromosome 11 at 11q23. Two mouse transgenic mouse models (APOA5 transgenic and APOA5 knockout) confirmed the important role of this gene in plasma triglyceride levels of plasma triglycerides. Obesity and metabolic syndrome are both closely related to plasma triglyceride levels and APOA5. Recent meta-analyses suggest that the effect on metabolic syndrome development is more profound for rs662799 in Asian population and for rs3135506 for Europeans. Moreover, meta-analysis that focused on rs662799 and the risk of type 2 diabetes mellitus has suggested a significant association in Asian populations, but not in European populations.

=== As a risk factor ===
Even though plasma concentration of APOA5 is very low, some studies have focused on the analysis of the potential association of this biochemical parameter with cardiovascular disease (CVD). This relationship remains controversial, as higher plasma levels of APOA5 in individuals with CVD disease have been found in some, but not in all studies.

=== Plasma lipids and cardiovascular disease ===
The major effect of the apolipoprotein A5 gene (and its variants) is on plasma triglyceride levels. Minor alleles (C1131 and Trp19) are primarily associated with the elevation of plasma triglyceride levels. The most extensive information available has been drawn from Caucasian populations, particularly in relation to the rs662799 SNP. Here, one minor allele is associated with an approximate 0.25 mmol/L increase of plasma TG levels. A similar effect is associated with the Trp19 allele, even though it has not been confirmed by a large number of studies. Original studies have further described that the strongest effect of APOA5 polymorphisms on plasma TG levels is observed among Hispanics, with only minor effects detected among Africans. Among Asians, the effect on plasma TG levels is similar to that found among Caucasians. Generally, studies have suggested significant interethnic differences and in some cases sex-dependent associations as well.

Sporadic publications have also mentioned a weak but nonetheless significant effect of APOA5 variants on plasma HDL-cholesterol and non-HDL cholesterol levels.

=== Myocardial infarction ===
A large meta-analysis of 101 studies confirmed a risk associated with the presence of the minor APOA5 allele -1131C and coronary heart disease. The odds ratio was 1.18 for every C allele. There are far fewer studies on the second common APOA5 polymorphism, Ser19>Trp, even though available studies have detected that its effect on plasma triglycerides is similar to C-1131>T. Nevertheless, the minor Trp allele is also associated with increased risk of CVD, and it seems that especially homozygotes and carriers of more minor alleles (both -1131C and 19Trp) are at higher risk of CVD.

=== Clinical marker ===
A multi-locus genetic risk score study based on a combination of 27 loci, including the APOA5 gene, identified individuals at increased risk for both incident and recurrent coronary artery disease events, as well as an enhanced clinical benefit from statin therapy. The study was based on a community cohort study (the Malmo Diet and Cancer study) and four additional randomized controlled trials of primary prevention cohorts (JUPITER and ASCOT) and secondary prevention cohorts (CARE and PROVE IT-TIMI 22).

=== BMI, metabolic syndrome ===
Obesity and metabolic syndrome are both closely related to plasma triglyceride levels. Therefore, the focus on an association between APOA5 and BMI or metabolic syndrome is understandable. Available studies show that minor APOA5 alleles could be associated with an enhanced risk of obesity or metabolic syndrome development. However, genome wide studies have failed to prove that APOA5 is a gene associated with BMI values and/or obesity, so the effect could be far from clinically significant or at least significantly context-dependent.

=== Nutri-, acti- and pharmacogenetic associations ===
Several studies have focused on changes of anthropometrical (body weight, BMI, WHR,...) or biochemical parameters (mostly plasma lipid levels) as a result of the interactions between common APOA5 variants and dietary habits (polyunsaturated fatty acid intake, n-3 and n-6 fatty acid intake, total fat and total energy intake, alcohol intake), dietary (lowering the energy intake) and/or physical activity interventions or dyslipidaemic (using statins or fenofibrate) treatment. Due to the high heterogeneity of the examined populations, differences in protocol and/or interventions used, the studies are difficult to directly compare and draw definitive conclusions. However, with caution, it could be concluded that carriers of the minor C-1131, Trp19, or T553 alleles are in some cases less prone to the positive effects of environmental and/or pharmacological interventions. Some papers suggest the importance of the interactions between APOA5 and other genes, especially with common APOE (OMIM acc. No. 107741) three allelic (E2, E3, and E4) polymorphism, in the modulation of plasma lipids. In these cases, the interaction between minor alleles of both genes seems to be of importance. In the general population, APOE4 seems to have the potential to diminish the effect of minor APOA5 rs662799 and rs3135506 alleles, especially in females. Interaction between APOE and APOA5 Ser19˃Trp has been suggested to play some role in the development of type III hyperlipidaemia. Further studies, in which interaction with APOA5 has been described, have included, for example, variants within FTO, lipoprotein lipase, USF-1 and FEN-1. They have also focused not only on plasma lipids, but on BMI values or hypertension as well.

=== Other roles ===
Some other possible roles of APOA5 variants have been discussed, but generally these reports comprise only one or two papers – and first original papers with positive findings are usually not confirmed in second publications. These papers focus on the possible effect of different APOA5 variants on maternal height, longer foetal birth length, putative associations with plasma levels of C-reactive protein, LDL particle size and haemostatic markers. Despite the very low plasma concentration, variants within apolipoprotein A5 are potent determinants of plasma triglyceride levels. Minor alleles of three SNPs (rs662799, rs3135506, rs3135507) are associated with the higher risk of cardiovascular disease.

== Interactive pathway map ==
Click on genes, proteins and metabolites below to link to respective articles. (Note: The interactive pathway map can be edited at WikiPathways: "Statin_Pathway_WP430".)

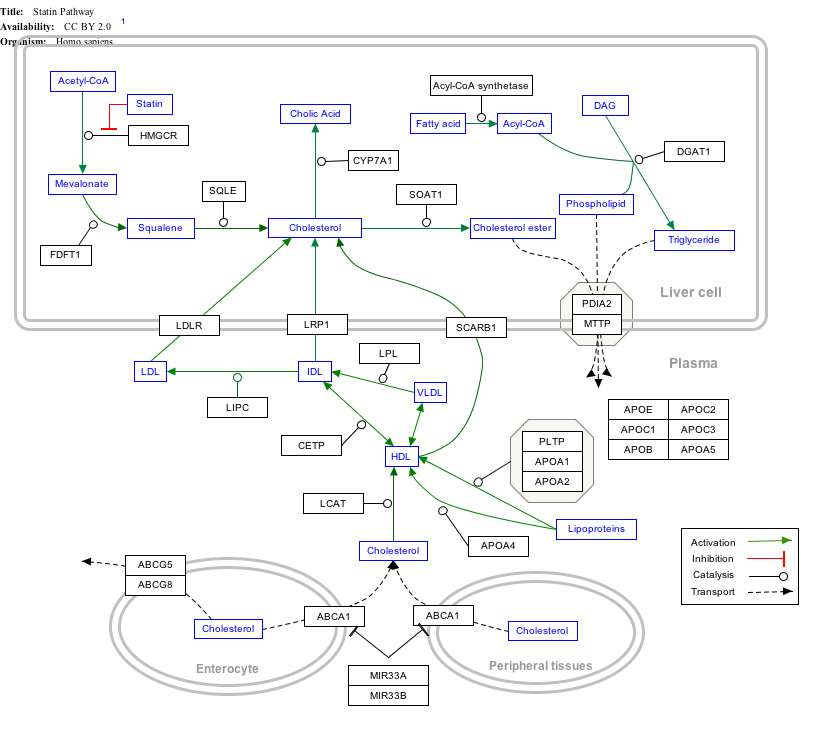

Statin pathway edit

== See also ==
- Apolipoprotein
