= Apolipoprotein L6 =

Protein-coding gene in the species Homo sapiens

An Error has occurred retrieving Wikidata item for infobox Apolipoprotein L6 is a protein that in humans is encoded by the APOL6 gene.

This gene is a member of the apolipoprotein L gene family. The encoded protein is found in the cytoplasm, where it may affect the movement of lipids or allow the binding of lipids to organelles.
