= Apolipoprotein C-I =

Protein-coding gene in the species Homo sapiens

APOC1
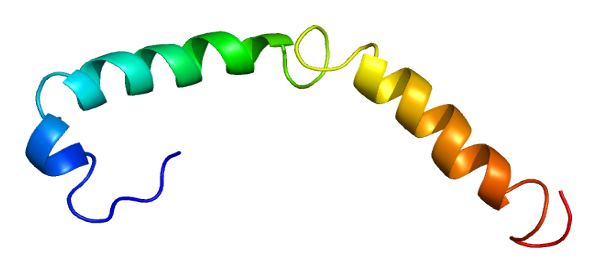

Identifiers
- Aliases: APOC1, Apo-CI, ApoC-I, apo-CIB, apoC-IB, apolipoprotein C1, Apolipoprotein C-I
- External IDs: OMIM: 107710; MGI: 88053; GeneCards: APOC1
Available structures
PDB	Ortholog search: PDBe RCSB
PDB	List of PDB id codes 1ALE, 1ALF, 1IOJ, 1OPP

Gene location (Human)
Chr.	Chromosome 19 (human)
Band	19q13.32	Start	44,914,247 bp
Band	19q13.32	End	44,919,349 bp

Gene location (Mouse)
Chr.	Chromosome 7 (mouse)
Band	7 A3|7 9.94 cM	Start	19,423,406 bp
Band	7 A3|7 9.94 cM	End	19,426,585 bp
RNA expression pattern
Bgee	Human / Mouse (ortholog); Top expressed in: right lobe of liver; left adrenal cortex; right adrenal cortex; nucleus accumbens; putamen; caudate nucleus; right lung; spleen; substantia nigra; hypothalamus / Top expressed in: left lobe of liver; gallbladder; lip; blastocyst; brown adipose tissue; skin of external ear; yolk sac; transitional epithelium of urinary bladder; esophagus; tunica adventitia of aorta; More reference expression data
BioGPS	n/a
Gene ontology
Molecular function	phospholipase inhibitor activity; lipase inhibitor activity; phosphatidylcholine binding; fatty acid binding; phosphatidylcholine-sterol O-acyltransferase activator activity
Cellular component	chylomicron; very-low-density lipoprotein particle; endoplasmic reticulum; high-density lipoprotein particle; extracellular region
Biological process	lipid transport; chylomicron remnant clearance; negative regulation of fatty acid biosynthetic process; lipid metabolism; positive regulation of cholesterol esterification; phospholipid efflux; cholesterol metabolic process; negative regulation of phosphatidylcholine catabolic process; plasma lipoprotein particle remodeling; negative regulation of very-low-density lipoprotein particle clearance; regulation of cholesterol transport; negative regulation of receptor-mediated endocytosis; high-density lipoprotein particle remodeling; cholesterol efflux; negative regulation of cholesterol transport; negative regulation of lipoprotein lipase activity; very-low-density lipoprotein particle assembly; negative regulation of lipid catabolic process; triglyceride metabolic process; negative regulation of lipid metabolic process; positive regulation of catalytic activity; very-low-density lipoprotein particle clearance; lipoprotein metabolic process
Sources:Amigo / QuickGO
Orthologs
Databases	NCBI: entry; OMA: entry
Species	Human	Mouse
Entrez	341	11812
Ensembl	ENSG00000130208	ENSMUSG00000040564
UniProt	P02654	P34928
RefSeq (mRNA)	NM_001645; NM_001321065; NM_001321066; NM_001379687	NM_001110009; NM_007469
RefSeq (protein)	NP_001307994; NP_001307995; NP_001636; NP_001366616	NP_001103479; NP_031495
Location (UCSC)	Chr 19: 44.91 – 44.92 Mb	Chr 7: 19.42 – 19.43 Mb
PubMed search
- Wikidata
View/Edit Human	View/Edit Mouse

ApoC-I
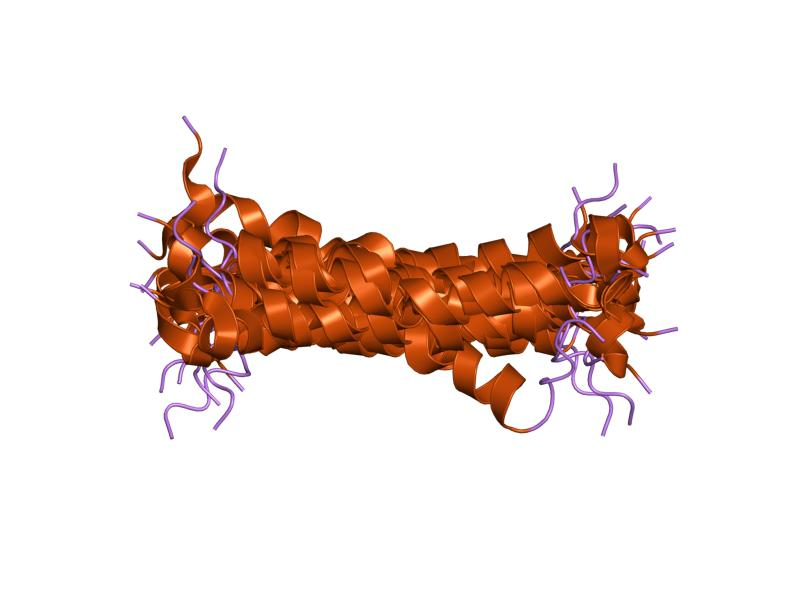
- structural studies of a baboon (papio sp.) plasma protein inhibitor of cholesteryl ester transferase.

Identifiers
- Symbol: ApoC-I
- Pfam: PF04691
- InterPro: IPR006781
- SCOP2: 1ale / SCOPe / SUPFAM
Available protein structures:
- PDB: IPR006781 PF04691 (ECOD; PDBsum)
- AlphaFold: IPR006781; PF04691

Apolipoprotein C-I is a protein component of lipoproteins that in humans is encoded by the APOC1 gene.

== Function ==
The protein encoded by this gene is a member of the apolipoprotein C family. This gene is expressed primarily in the liver, and it is activated when monocytes differentiate into macrophages. Alternatively spliced transcript variants have been found for this gene, but the biological validity of some variants has not been determined.

Apolipoprotein C-I has a length of 57 amino acids normally found in plasma and responsible for the activation of esterified lecithin cholesterol with an important role in the exchange of esterified cholesterol between lipoproteins and in removal of cholesterol from tissues. Its main function is inhibition of cholesteryl ester transfer protein (CETP), probably by altering the electric charge of HDL molecules.

During fasting (like other apolipoprotein C), it is found primarily within HDL, while after a meal it is found on the surface of other lipoproteins. When proteins rich in triglycerides like chylomicrons and VLDL are broken down, this apoprotein is transferred again to HDL. It is one of the most positively charged proteins in the human body.

== Pseudogene ==
A pseudogene of this gene is located 4 kb downstream from the apoC-I gene in the same orientation on chromosome 19, where both reside within an apolipoprotein gene cluster. This pseudogene, which was also reported to have been present in Denisovans and Neandertals, originated from two separate events. Following the divergence of New World monkeys from the human lineage, the apoC-I gene was duplicated. Old World monkeys and great apes other than humans have been shown to have two active genes. One of the duplicates encodes a basic protein designated apoC-IB that is orthologous to human apolipoprotein C-I. The other encodes an acidic protein, apoC-IA, that is orthologous to the virtual protein encoded by the pseudogene. The pseudogenization event occurred sometime between the divergence of bonobos and chimpanzees from the human lineage and the arrival of Denisovans and Neandertals. The pseudogene is due to a change in a single nucleotide in the codon for the penultimate amino acid, i.e. glutamine, in the signal sequence, resulting in a stop codon.

== Interactive pathway map ==
Click on genes, proteins and metabolites below to link to respective articles. (Note: The interactive pathway map can be edited at WikiPathways: "Statin_Pathway_WP430".)

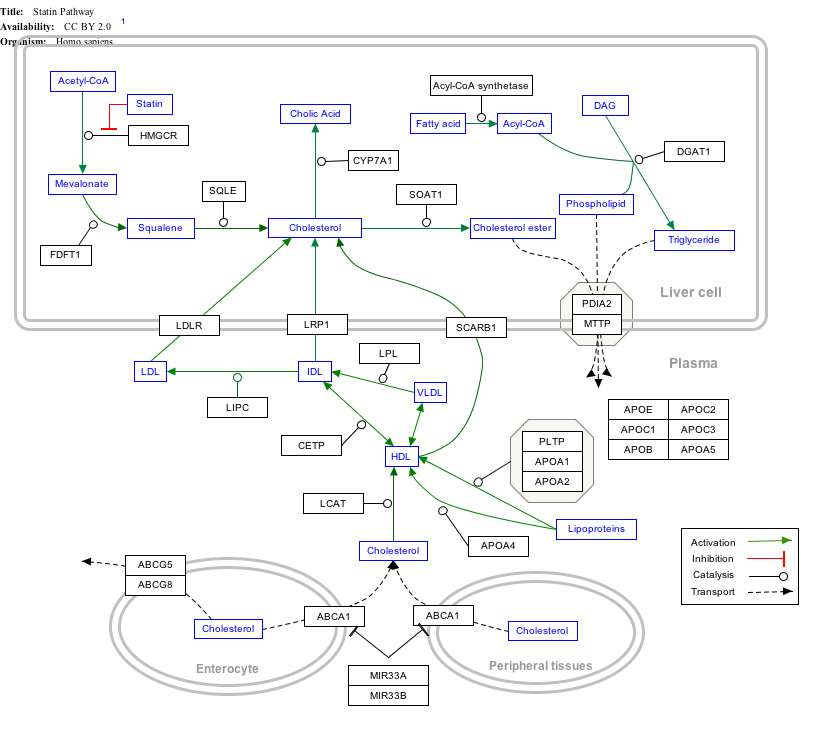

Statin pathway edit
