= Apolipoprotein L3 =

Protein-coding gene in the species Homo sapiens

An Error has occurred retrieving Wikidata item for infobox Apolipoprotein L3 is a protein that in humans is encoded by the APOL3 gene. Expressed in the gut, it has antibiotic properties.

This gene is a member of the apolipoprotein L gene family. The encoded protein is found in the cytoplasm, where it may affect the movement of lipids or allow the binding of lipids to organelles. In addition, expression of this gene is upregulated by tumor necrosis factor-alpha in endothelial cells lining the normal and atherosclerotic iliac artery and aorta. Six transcript variants encoding three different isoforms have been found for this gene.
