= Apolipoprotein L2 =

Protein-coding gene in the species Homo sapiens

An Error has occurred retrieving Wikidata item for infobox Apolipoprotein L2 is a protein that in humans is encoded by the APOL2 gene.

This gene is a member of the apolipoprotein L gene family and protein in this family are lipid-binding proteins. This gene encodes a 37.1 kDa protein and The protein sequence contains 337bp. Localization of this protein is mainly found in the cytosol, nucleoplasm and additionally, it is also seen in the Nuclear bodies. The involvement of this gene may affect in the movement of lipids and binding of lipids to organelles. Two transcript variants encoding the same protein have been found for this gene.

== Amino acid sequence ==
MNPESSIFIE DYLKYFQDQV SRENLLQLLT DDEAWNGFVA AAELPRDEAD ELRKALNKLA SHMVMKDKNR HDKDQQHRQW FLKEFPRLKR ELEDHIRKLR ALAEEVEQVH RGTTIANVVS NSVGTTSGIL TLLGLGLAPF TEGISFVLLD TGMGLGAAAA VAGITCSVVE LVNKLRARAQ ARNLDQSGTN VAKVMKEFVG GNTPNVLTLV DNWYQVTQGI GRNIRAIRRA RANPQLGAYA PPPHVIGRIS AEGGEQVERV VEGPAQAMSR GTMIVGAATG GILLLLDVVS LAYESKHLLE GAKSESAEEL KKRAQELEGK LNFLTKIHEM LQPGQDQ

Total amino acids: 337

== Interactions ==
APOL2 has been shown to interact with:

- IFN-γ,
- CD81,
- TNF-α,
- Bcl-2,

== Splice variants ==
ApoL2 has 5 splice variants,

- APOL2-001

This transcript has 6 exons, 12 domains and features are annotated, 263 variations are related this and maps to 35 oligo probes.

- APOL2-002

This transcript has 5 exons, 12 domains and features are annotated, 263 variations are related with this gene and maps to 37 oligo probes.

- APOL2-006

This transcript has 6 exons, is annotated with 3 domains and features, 62 variations are related with this gene and maps to 20 oligo probes.

- APOL2-008

This transcript has 6 exons, 12 domains and features are annotated, 331 variations are related with this gene and maps to 32 oligo probes.

- APOL2-009

This transcript has 5 exons, 4 domains and features are annotated, 104 variations are related with this gene and maps to 13 oligo probes.

== Functions of the ApoL2 ==
- Acute Inflammation Response
- Cholesterol Metabolic Process
- Lipid Metabolic Process
- Maternal Process Involved in Female Pregnancy
- Lipid binding
- Signalling Receptor Binding
- Aging
