= Apolipoprotein C =

Chemical compound

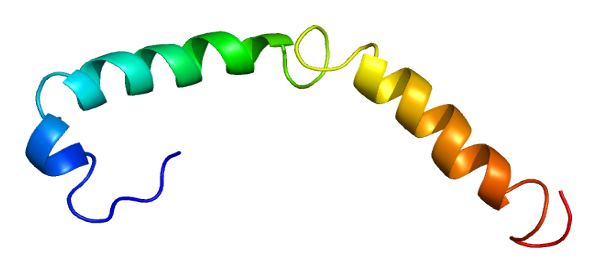
Structure of the APOC1 protein

In the field of molecular biology, apolipoprotein C is a family of four low molecular weight apolipoproteins, designated as C-I, C-II, C-III, and C-IV. These are surface components of chylomicrons, VLDL, and HDL. When an organism is in the fasting state, the C apolipoproteins are mainly associated with HDL. But during absorption of dietary fat, the C apolipoproteins preferentially redistribute to the surface of the triglyceride-rich chylomicrons and VLDL.
