= Apolipoprotein C-IV =

Protein-coding gene in the species Homo sapiens

APOC4

Identifiers
- Aliases: APOC4, APO-CIV, APOC-IV, apolipoprotein C4
- External IDs: OMIM: 600745; MGI: 87878; HomoloGene: 1245; GeneCards: APOC4; OMA:APOC4 - orthologs

Gene location (Human)
Chr.	Chromosome 19 (human)
Band	19q13.32	Start	44,942,237 bp
Band	19q13.32	End	44,945,496 bp

Gene location (Mouse)
Chr.	Chromosome 7 (mouse)
Band	7 A3|7 9.94 cM	Start	19,412,008 bp
Band	7 A3|7 9.94 cM	End	19,415,404 bp
RNA expression pattern
Bgee	Human / Mouse (ortholog); Top expressed in: right lobe of liver; testicle; mucosa of transverse colon; sural nerve; left adrenal cortex; right adrenal gland; right ovary; ventricular zone; right adrenal cortex; gallbladder / Top expressed in: left lobe of liver; gallbladder; adrenal gland; fetal liver hematopoietic progenitor cell; yolk sac; sexually immature organism; human fetus; embryo; morula; stomach; More reference expression data
BioGPS	n/a
Gene ontology
Molecular function	lipid transporter activity
Cellular component	high-density lipoprotein particle; extracellular region; very-low-density lipoprotein particle
Biological process	lipid transport; positive regulation of sequestering of triglyceride; triglyceride homeostasis; lipid metabolism; very-low-density lipoprotein particle assembly; very-low-density lipoprotein particle clearance
Sources:Amigo / QuickGO
Orthologs
Species	Human	Mouse
Entrez	346	11425
Ensembl	ENSG00000267467	ENSMUSG00000074336
UniProt	P55056	Q61268
RefSeq (mRNA)	NM_001646	NM_007385
RefSeq (protein)	NP_001637	NP_031411
Location (UCSC)	Chr 19: 44.94 – 44.95 Mb	Chr 7: 19.41 – 19.42 Mb
PubMed search
- Wikidata
View/Edit Human	View/Edit Mouse

Apolipoprotein C-IV, also known as apolipoprotein C4, is a protein that in humans is encoded by the APOC4 gene.

== Function ==
APOC4 is a member of the apolipoprotein C gene family. It is expressed in the liver and has a predicted protein structure characteristic of the other genes in this family. APOC4 is a 3.3-kb gene consisting of 3 exons and 2 introns; it is located 0.5 kb 5' to the APOC2 gene.
