= EVI5 =

Protein-coding gene in humans

Identifiers
- Aliases: EVI5, NB4S, EVI-5, ecotropic viral integration site 5
- External IDs: OMIM: 602942; MGI: 104736; GeneCards: EVI5

Gene location (Human)
Chr.	Chromosome 1 (human)
Band	1p22.1	Start	92,508,696 bp
Band	1p22.1	End	92,792,404 bp

Gene location (Mouse)
Chr.	Chromosome 5 (mouse)
Band	5 F|5 52.23 cM	Start	107,892,661 bp
Band	5 F|5 52.23 cM	End	108,022,973 bp
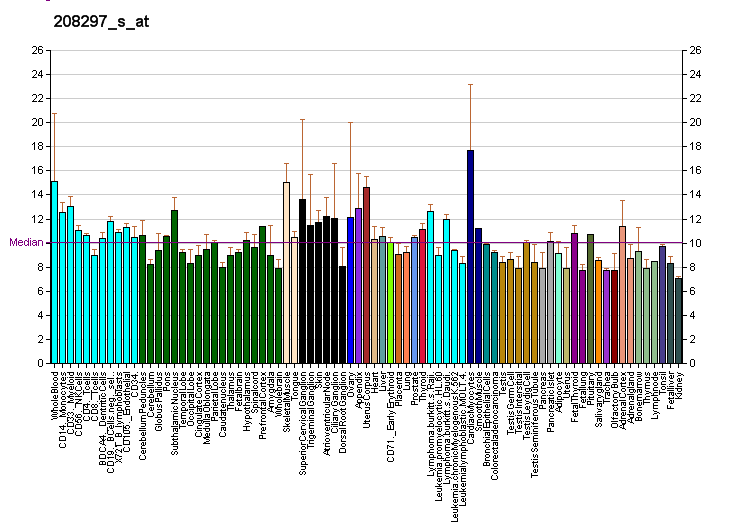

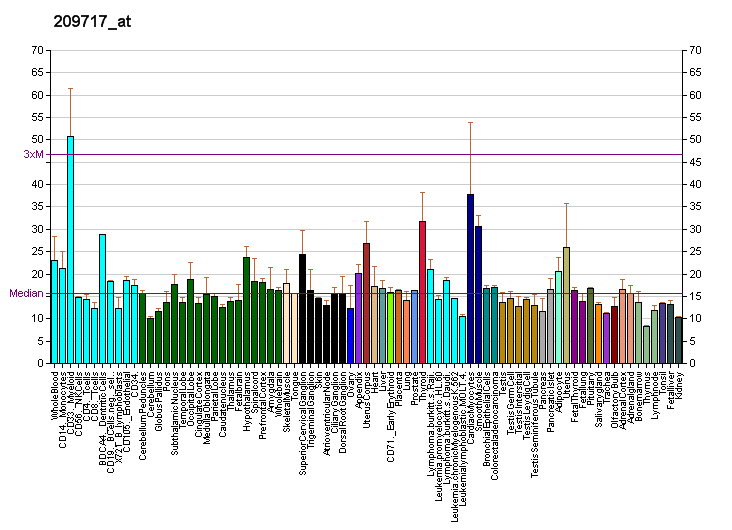
RNA expression pattern
Bgee	Human / Mouse (ortholog); Top expressed in: Achilles tendon; sural nerve; tendon of biceps brachii; Epithelium of choroid plexus; skin of hip; testicle; seminal vesicula; parietal pleura; corpus callosum; visceral pleura / Top expressed in: zygote; sciatic nerve; secondary oocyte; epithelium of lens; Rostral migratory stream; saccule; facial motor nucleus; primary oocyte; left lobe of liver; cumulus cell; More reference expression data
BioGPS	More reference expression data
Gene ontology
Molecular function	protein binding; GTPase activator activity
Cellular component	cytoplasm; cytosol; spindle; cytoskeleton; nucleus; microtubule organizing center; endomembrane system; Golgi apparatus; intracellular membrane-bounded organelle
Biological process	cell division; multicellular organism development; regulation of cilium assembly; regulation of GTPase activity; cell cycle; cell population proliferation; retrograde transport, endosome to Golgi; regulation of vesicle fusion; intracellular protein transport; activation of GTPase activity; positive regulation of GTPase activity
Sources:Amigo / QuickGO
Orthologs
Databases	NCBI: entry; OMA: entry
Species	Human	Mouse
Entrez	7813	14020
Ensembl	ENSG00000067208	ENSMUSG00000011831
UniProt	O60447	P97366
RefSeq (mRNA)	NM_001308248; NM_005665; NM_001350197; NM_001350198; NM_001377210 NM_001377211; NM_001377212; NM_001377213	NM_007964; NM_001378824; NM_001378825
RefSeq (protein)	NP_001295177; NP_005656; NP_001337126; NP_001337127; NP_001364139 NP_001364140; NP_001364141; NP_001364142	n/a
Location (UCSC)	Chr 1: 92.51 – 92.79 Mb	Chr 5: 107.89 – 108.02 Mb
PubMed search
- Wikidata
View/Edit Human	View/Edit Mouse

Ecotropic viral integration site 5 protein homolog is a protein that in humans is encoded by the EVI5 gene.
