= APOLD1 =

Protein-coding gene in the species Homo sapiens

Identifiers
- Aliases: APOLD1, VERGE, apolipoprotein L domain containing 1
- External IDs: OMIM: 612456; MGI: 2685921; HomoloGene: 12781; GeneCards: APOLD1; OMA:APOLD1 - orthologs

Gene location (Human)
Chr.	Chromosome 12 (human)
Band	12p13.1	Start	12,725,917 bp
Band	12p13.1	End	12,829,975 bp

Gene location (Mouse)
Chr.	Chromosome 6 (mouse)
Band	6|6 G1	Start	134,958,681 bp
Band	6|6 G1	End	134,963,799 bp
RNA expression pattern
Bgee	Human / Mouse (ortholog); Top expressed in: endothelial cell; pericardium; thoracic diaphragm; lower lobe of lung; mucosa of urinary bladder; subcutaneous adipose tissue; Epithelium of choroid plexus; left uterine tube; olfactory bulb; inferior olivary nucleus / Top expressed in: endothelial cell of lymphatic vessel; semi-lunar valve; retinal pigment epithelium; aortic valve; islet of Langerhans; spermatocyte; olfactory bulb; ascending aorta; atrioventricular valve; brown adipose tissue; More reference expression data
BioGPS	n/a
Gene ontology
Molecular function	lipid binding
Cellular component	extracellular region; plasma membrane; integral component of membrane; membrane; nucleoplasm; cytosol
Biological process	angiogenesis; response to hypoxia; lipid transport; cell differentiation; endothelial cell activation; lipoprotein metabolic process; regulation of endothelial cell differentiation; multicellular organism development
Sources:Amigo / QuickGO
Orthologs
Species	Human	Mouse
Entrez	81575	381823
Ensembl	ENSG00000178878	ENSMUSG00000090698
UniProt	Q96LR9	E9Q0X2
RefSeq (mRNA)	NM_030817; NM_001130415	NM_001109914
RefSeq (protein)	NP_001123887; NP_110444	NP_001103384
Location (UCSC)	Chr 12: 12.73 – 12.83 Mb	Chr 6: 134.96 – 134.96 Mb
PubMed search
- Wikidata
View/Edit Human	View/Edit Mouse

Apolipoprotein L domain containing 1 is a protein in humans that is encoded by the APOLD1 gene. It is located on Chromosome 12.

APOLD1 is an endothelial cell early response protein that may play a role in regulation of endothelial cell signaling and vascular function (Regard et al., 2004 [PubMed 15102925]).[supplied by OMIM, Dec 2008].
