= Fat body =

Organ for nutrient storage and conversion in arthropods

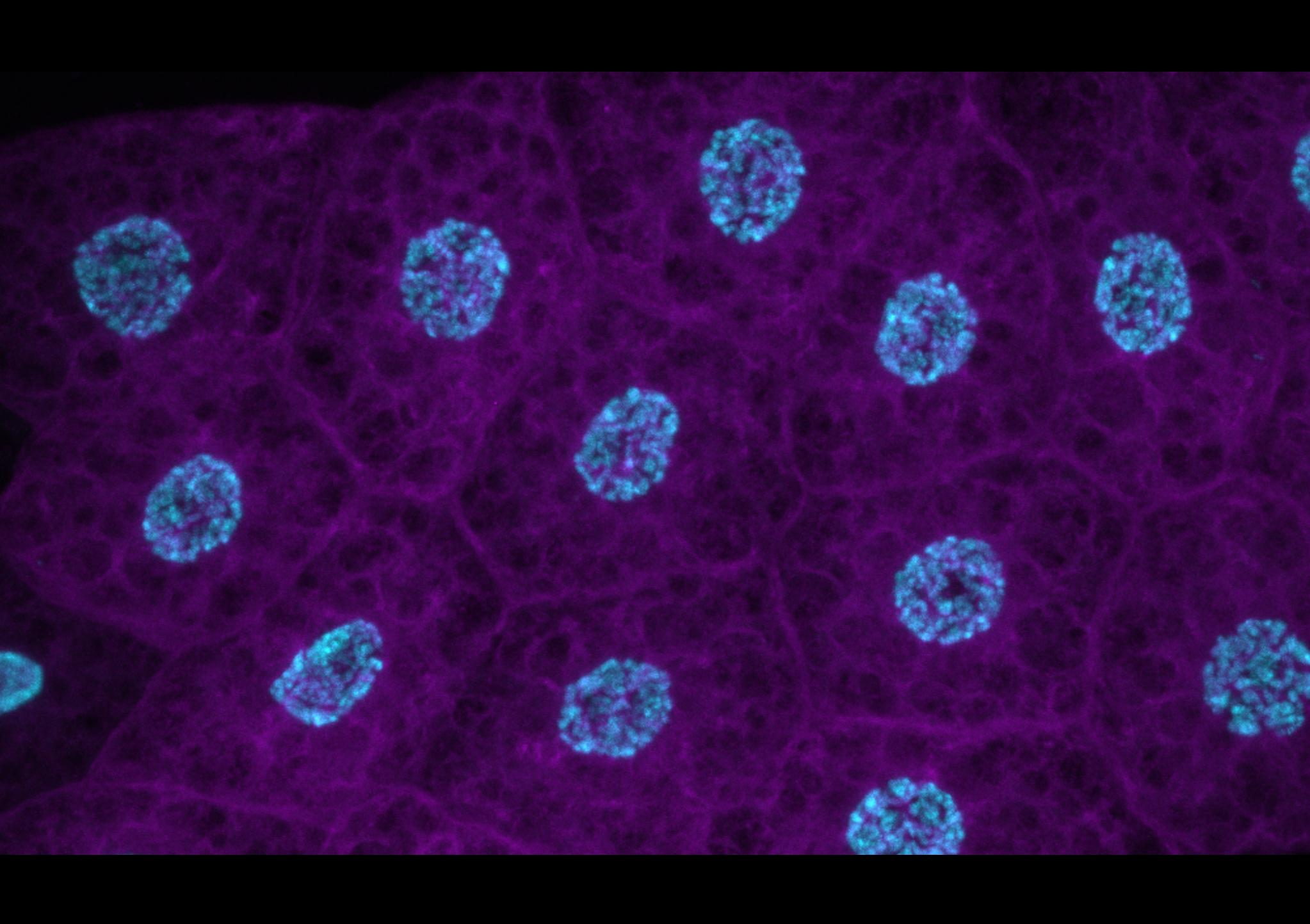
Stained cells of an insect fat body

Fat body is a highly dynamic insect tissue composed primarily of storage cells. It is distributed throughout the insect's internal body cavity (the haemocoel), close to the hemolymph as well as organs such as the epidermis, digestive organs and ovaries. Its main functions are nutrient storage and metabolism, for which it is commonly compared to a combination of adipose tissue and liver in mammals. However, it may also serve a variety of other roles, such as: endocrine regulation, systemic immunity, vitellogenesis, and the main site of production of antimicrobial molecules called antimicrobial peptides (or AMPs).

Its presence, structure, cellular composition, location, and functions vary widely among insects, even between different species of the same genus or between developmental stages of the same individual, with other specialized organs taking over some or all of its functions.

== Functions ==
The fat body serves different roles including lipid storage and metabolism, endocrine regulation, and immunity. The fat body contains specialized cells called mycetocytes that contain symbiotic prokaryotes living within them. The fat body regulates insect development and longevity through regulatory molecules known as fat body signals.

== Development ==
The fat body is of mesodermal origin and is normally composed of a network of thin sheets, ribbons or small nodules suspended in hemocoel by connective tissue and tracheae, so that most of its cells are in direct contact with hemolymph.

== Other arthropods ==
The fat body has been best studied in insects. Nevertheless, it is present in other arthropod subphyla including Chelicerata, Crustacea, and all major classes of Myriapoda, although not all subtaxa.
