= Apolipoprotein =

Proteins that bind lipids to transport them in body fluids

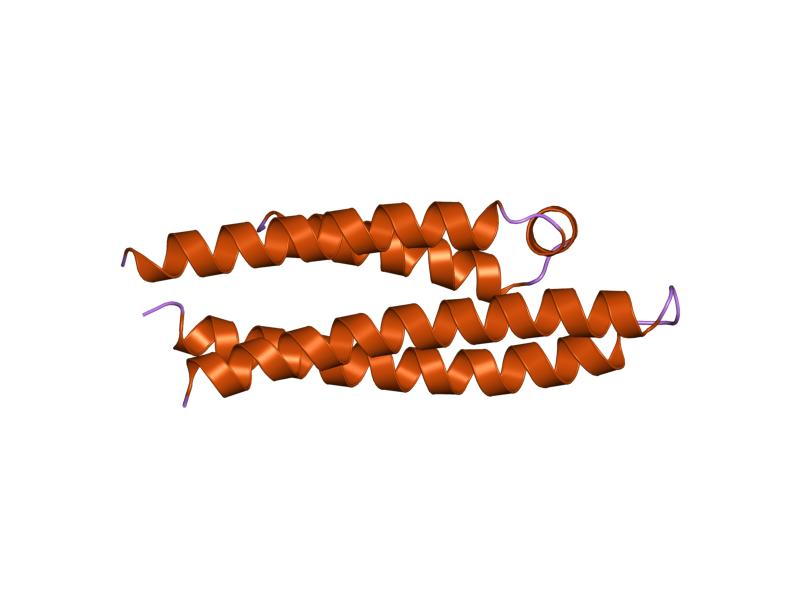
- Apolipoprotein e3 (Apoe3)

Identifiers
- Symbol: Apolipoprotein
- Pfam: PF01442
- InterPro: IPR000074
- SCOP2: 1oef / SCOPe / SUPFAM
- OPM superfamily: 172
- OPM protein: 3r2p
Available protein structures:
- PDB: IPR000074 PF01442 (ECOD; PDBsum)
- AlphaFold: IPR000074; PF01442

Apolipoproteins are proteins that bind lipids (oil-soluble substances such as fats, cholesterol and fat soluble vitamins) to form lipoproteins. They transport lipids in blood, cerebrospinal fluid and lymph.

The lipid components of lipoproteins are insoluble in water. However, because of their detergent-like (amphipathic) properties, apolipoproteins and other amphipathic molecules (such as phospholipids) can surround the lipids, creating a lipoprotein particle that is itself water-soluble, and can thus be carried through body fluids (i.e., blood, lymph).

In addition to stabilizing lipoprotein structure and solubilizing the lipid component, apolipoproteins interact with lipoprotein receptors and lipid transport proteins, thereby participating in lipoprotein uptake and clearance. They also serve as enzyme cofactors for specific enzymes involved in the metabolism of lipoproteins.

Apolipoproteins are also exploited by hepatitis C virus (HCV) to enable virus entry, assembly, and transmission. They play a role in viral pathogenesis and viral evasion from neutralizing antibodies.

== Functions ==
Different lipoproteins contain different classes of apolipoproteins, which influence their function.

Apolipoprotein AI (apoA1) is the major structural protein component of high-density lipoproteins (HDL), although it is present in other lipoproteins in smaller amounts. Apolipoprotein A-IV (apoA4) is present in chylomicrons, very-low-density lipoproteins (VLDL), and HDL. It is thought to act primarily in reverse cholesterol transport and intestinal lipid absorption via chylomicron assembly and secretion. ApoA-IV synthesized in hypothalamus is suggested to be a satiating factor which regulates the food intake of the rodent.

Apolipoprotein B plays a particularly important role in lipoprotein transport being the primary organizing protein of many lipoproteins.

Apolipoprotein C-III (apoC3) plays an important role in lipid metabolism specific in regulating the metabolism of triglyceride-rich lipoproteins (TRLs).

Apolipoprotein D (apoD) is a soluble carrier protein of lipophilic molecules in neurons and glial cells within the central and peripheral nervous system and apoD can also modulate the stability and oxidation status of these molecules.

Apolipoprotein E (apoE) plays an important role in the transport and uptake of cholesterol by way of its high affinity interaction with lipoprotein receptors, including the low-density lipoprotein (LDL) receptor. ApoE is the major lipoprotein in the central nervous system. Recent findings with apoA1 and apoE suggest that the tertiary structures of these two members of the human exchangeable apolipoprotein gene family are related. The three-dimensional structure of the LDL receptor-binding domain of apoE indicates that the protein forms an unusually elongated four-helix bundle that may be stabilised by a tightly packed hydrophobic core that includes leucine zipper-type interactions and by numerous salt bridges on the mostly charged surface. Basic amino acids important for LDL receptor binding are clustered into a surface patch on one long helix.

Apolipoprotein F (apoF) is one of the minor apolipoprotein in blood plasma and it is a lipid transfer inhibit protein to inhibit cholesteryl ester transfer protein-mediated transfers of cholesteryl esters and triglycerides.

Apolipoprotein M (apoM) participates in the lipid metabolism and exhibit anti‑atherosclerotic functions and it is presented in high-density lipoprotein (HDL), low-density lipoprotein (LDL) and very low-density lipoprotein (VLDL).

== Classes ==
There are multiple classes of apolipoproteins and several sub-classes:

- Apolipoprotein A (Apo-AI, Apo-A2, Apo-A4, and Apo-A5) (Note: Either roman numerals or arabic numbers may be used for gene family members. For example, apoA5 is also known as apo A-V.)
- Apolipoprotein B (Apo-B48 and Apo B-100) (Note: Isoforms from the same gene by alternative splicing.)
- Apolipoprotein C (ApoC-I, apo ApoC-II, apo ApoC-III, and ApoC-IV)
- Apolipoprotein D
- Apolipoprotein E
- Apolipoprotein F
- Apolipoprotein H – a misnomer
- Apolipoprotein L
- Apolipoprotein M
- Apolipoprotein(a)

Exchangeable apolipoproteins (apoA, apoC, and apoE) have the same genomic structure and are members of a multi-gene family that probably evolved from a common ancestral gene. Apo-AI and ApoA4 are part of the APOA1/C3/A4/A5 gene cluster on chromosome 11.

Hundreds of genetic polymorphisms of the apolipoproteins have been described, and many of them alter their structure and function.

=== Evolution ===
The cluster of exchangeable apoliproteins is well conserved in vertebrates. The family diversified by duplication, with the ancestral gene most similar to ApoC1.

Beyond vertebrates, proteins similar to the exchangeable ApoA/C/E and the nonexchangable Apo-B are found in a wide range of animals and choanoflagellates. This suggests that the ancestral animal already has both kinds of apolipoproteins. In arthropods in particular, diacylglycerol-carrying apolipoproteins are known as apolipophorins, with the ApoA/C/E-like one known as apolipophorin III and the Apo-B like one known as apolipophorin I/II.

== Synthesis and regulation ==
Apolipoprotein synthesis in the intestine is regulated principally by the fat content of the diet.

Apolipoprotein synthesis in the liver is controlled by a host of factors, including dietary composition, hormones (insulin, glucagon, thyroxin, estrogens, androgens), alcohol intake, and various drugs (statins, niacin, and fibric acids). ApoB is an integral apoprotein whereas the others are peripheral apoproteins.

Apolipoprotein synthesis such as ApoA4 in hypothalamus involves in the integration of signals for regulation of food intake which is regulated by vagal nerve and cholecystokinin.

== Disease ==
Apolipoprotein has been suggested to be implicated in several types of diseases and dysfunction.

ApoC1 level increases in neuropathic pain and fibromyalgia patients which suggest it plays an important role in occurrence of these conditions.

ApoC3 is a risk factor of cardiovascular disease. Accumulation of plasma TRLs caused by elevated apoC-III leading to hypertriglyceridaemia.

ApoD level increases in nervous system with a large number of neurologic disorders inclusive of Alzheimer's disease, schizophrenia, and stroke.

ApoE has been implicated in dementia and Alzheimer's disease.

Apo(a) is a component of lipoprotein(a) (Lp(a)) and elevated plasma Lp(a) level is a heritable, independent, and possibly causal risk factor for Atherosclerotic Cardiovascular Disease (ASCVD). The cholesterol-rich apoB-containing lipoproteins also participate in the pathogenesis of ASCVD.
