= Immunologic constant of rejection =

The Immunologic Constant of Rejection (ICR), is a notion introduced by biologists to group a shared set of genes expressed in tissue destructive-pathogenic conditions like cancer and infection, along a diverse set of physiological circumstances of tissue damage or organ failure, including autoimmune disease or allograft rejection. The identification of shared mechanisms and phenotypes by distinct immune pathologies, marked as a hallmarks or biomarkers, aids in the identification of novel treatment options, without necessarily assessing patients phenomenologies individually.

== Concept ==
The concept of immunologic constant of rejection is based on the proposition that:

- Tissue-specific destruction does not necessarily only occur after non-self recognition of the body, but can also occur against self- or quasi-self; such as the phenotypes observed in autoimmune diseases.
- Immune cells required for the induction of a cognate/adaptive immune response differ from those cells necessary for the activation of an effector immune response.
- Although the causes of tissue-specific destruction vary among pathologic states, the effector immune response observed in these conditions is found to converge into one single mechanism, including the activation of adaptive and innate cytotoxic mechanisms.
- Adaptive immunity participates as a tissue-specific trigger, but it is not always sufficient or necessary for tissue destruction. Intensive work on factors activated during immune-mediated rejection have concluded that tissue-specific destruction is correlated with the expression of interferons (IFNa and IFNy), and Interferon-stimulated gene (ISGs).

== Mechanism ==
In the case of autoimmunity and/or allograft rejection, immunity broadens in the target organ by producing chemokines of the CXCL family that recruit the receptor CXCR3-bearing cytotoxic T cells. These initiate the following cascade:

1. CXCR3 ligand chemokines (CXCL-9, -10 and -11) are produced in response to activated B cells and the pro-inflammatory secretion of interleukin 12 (IL12) and/or interferon-gamma (IFNy) by antigen-presenting cells (APCs).
2. CXCR3 expressing Th1-polarized CD4 T cells and cytotoxic T cells are recruited to the site of acute inflammation.
3. Antigen-activated T cells secrete CCR5 ligands (CCL2 and CCL3) to recruit natural killer (NK) cells and other innate immune effector cells to the site of acute inflammation.
4. Several cytotoxic mechanisms converge on the target tissue, and its complete destruction occurs through the activated effects of CTLs, NK cells, granulocytes, macrophages and dendritic cells.

As such, 20 genes involved in this cascade make up the ICR gene set, including:

- T helper type 1 (Th1) cell-related factors such as IFNy, signal transducers and activator of transcription 1 (STAT1), IL12B, Interferon-regulatory factor 1 (IRF1), the transcription factor T-bet (TBX21).
- CD8 Tcell markers : CD8A & CD8B
- Immune effector or cytotoxic factors like the granzymes GZMA, GZMB, GZMH, perforin PRF1, and granulysin GNLY.
- Chemokine ligands CXCL9, CXCL10, and CCL5 that bind to chemokine receptors such as CXCR3 and CCR5,
- Immune suppressive or counter regulatory genes like IDO1, PDCD1, PDL1 (CD274), CTLA4 and FOXP3

== Clinical significance ==
=== Cancer ===
The disrupted homeostasis of cancer cells is found to initiate processes promoting cell growth. To illustrate, growth factors and chemokines activated in response to injury are recruited by tumour cells, sustaining chronic inflammation; similarly to the immune phenotype found in chronic infection, allograft rejection and autoimmunity diseases. The role of immunity in cancer is demonstrated by the predictive and prognostic role of tumour-infiltrating lymphocytes (TIL) and immune response gene signatures. In several cancers these genes show great correlation. A high expression of these genes indicates an active immune engagement, and at least a partial rejection of the cancer tissue.

==== Breast Cancer ====
In breast cancer increased survival is observed in patients displaying a high level of ICR gene expression. This immune active phenotype was associated with an increased level of mutations while the poor immune phenotype was defined by perturbation in the MAPK signalling pathways.

The consensus clustering of tumours based on ICR gene expression provides an assessment of the prognosis and response to immunotherapy. To illustrate, classification of breast cancer into four classes (ranking from ICR4 to ICR1) have shown better levels of immune anti-tumour response in ICR4 tumours, as well as a prolonged survival in comparison to ICR1-3 tumours. Another study have assessed the clinico-biological value of ICR in breast cancer, via the classification of around 8700 breast tumours and assessment of metastasis-free survival and pathological complete response to neoadjuvant chemotherapy.

It has been proven that ICR signature is associated with metastasis-free survival and pathological response to chemotherapy. The increased enrichment of immune signature reflects the expression of cells including T cells, cytotoxic T cells, Th-1 cells, CD8+ T cells, Tγδ cells, and APCs; which defines tumours as immune-active and immune-silent. [7] Although being associated with poor-prognosis, the infiltration of immune cells in ICR4 tumours have resulted in a longer metastasis-free survival and better response to chemotherapy, proving the importance of immune reaction in breast cancer. It was also shown that ICR classification is dependent upon intrinsic molecular subtype of breast tumours, being highly present in triple-negative and HER2+ tumours.

=== Colon Cancer ===
A cohort of fresh-frozen samples from 348 patients affected by primary colon cancer (AC-ICAM) was used for genomic examination. this examination revealed that a TH1 cell/cytotoxic immune activation, as captured by the ICR, immunoediting, concurrent expansion of TCR clonotypes and specific intratumoral microbiome composition, were associated with a favorable clinical outcome. The results also revealed that the ICR was associated with overall survival independently of Consensus Molecular Subtypes (CMS) and microsatellite instability (MSI).

In addition, they identified a microbiome signature with strong prognostic value (MBR risk score). The researchers then combined the ICR with the MBR risk score to get a new multi-omics biomarker (mICRoScore) that was able to predict exceptionally long survival in patients with colon cancer.

==== Pancancer ====
A pre-existing intratumoral anti-tumor T helper (Th-1) immune response has been linked to favorable outcomes with immunotherapy, but not all immunologically active cancers respond to treatment. In a pan-cancer analysis using The Cancer Genome Atlas (TCGA) including 31 cancer types from 9282 patients, high expression of the ICR signature was associated with significant prolonged survival in breast invasive carcinoma, skin cutaneous melanoma, sarcoma, and uterine corpus endometrial carcinoma, while this "hot" immune phenotype was associated with reduced overall survival in uveal melanoma, low grade glioma, pancreatic adenocarcinoma and kidney renal clear cell carcinoma. In a systemic analysis, cancer-specific pathways were found to modulate the prognostic value of ICR. In tumors with a high proliferation score, ICR was linked to better survival, while in tumors with low proliferation no association with survival was observed. In tumors dominated by cancer signaling, for example by increased TGF beta signaling, the "hot" immune phenotype did not have any survival benefit, suggesting that the immune response is heavily suppressed without protective effect.

The clinical relevance of this finding was demonstrated in the Van Allen dataset with tumor samples of melanoma patients treated with checkpoint inhibitor anti-CTLA4. Overall, a significantly increased expression of ICR was observed in responders compared to non-responders. However, an association of high ICR scores pretreatment with survival was only observed for samples with high proliferation scores. Conversely, ICR was only associated with survival in samples with low TGF beta expression.

=== Soft tissue sarcoma ===
In soft tissue sarcoma, a cohort of 1455 non-metastatic samples had the ICR retrospectively applied to them to discover links between ICR classes and clinicopathological and biological variables. Because of this, the cohort was thus divided into 4 groups labelled as ICR1, ICR2, ICR3 and ICR4 with each consisting of 34, 27, 24, and 15% of the tumors. The aforementioned groups were created while taking into account the age, pathology depth, and enrichment value ICR1 through 4 of quantitative/qualitative scores of immune responses. When ICR1 is compared to ICR2-4 classes, there was an increase of 59% of metastatic relapse. Multivariate analysis also showed that the ICR classification remained associated with MFS as well as pathological type and CINSARC classification, suggesting that there is an independent prognostic value. The presence of an ICR signature is linked to postoperative MFS in early-stage STS, regardless of other prognostic factors such as CINSARC. A prognostic clinicogenomic model was created which combines ICR, CINSARC, and pathological type to provide a reliable prediction of outcomes. Additionally, the study proposes that each prognostic group has varying levels of susceptibility to different systemic therapies.

=== Pediatric Cancers ===
A large a systematic analysis of public RNAseq data (TARGET) for five pediatric tumor types: osteosarcoma (OS), neuroblastoma (NBL), clear cell sarcoma of the kidney (CCSK), Wilms tumor (WLM) and rhabdoid tumor of the kidney (RT) showed a very important role of ICR in pediatric tumors. It was discovered that a lower ICR score was associated with lower survival in WLM while higher ICR score was associated with a better survival in OS and high risk NBL without MYCN amplification. Immune traits were then used to cluster the samples into 6 different immune subtypes (S1-S6) with each having different and distinct survival outcomes. For example, the S2 cluster illustrated the highest overall survival, distinguished by low enrichment of the wound healing signature, high Th1, and low Th2 infiltration. However, the opposite was highlighted in S4. Upregulation of the WNT/Beta-catenin pathway was associated with unfavorable outcomes and decreased T-cell infiltration in OS.

=== Other diseases ===
Molecular pathways including IFN-stimulated genes activation; the recruitment of NK cells and T cells, by the secretion of CCL5 and CXCL9-10; and the induction of immune effector mechanisms are found overlapping in conditions like autoimmunity, as a results of host-against-self reaction, where immune cells initiate tissue-specific destruction. Similarly, allografting results in a strong immune response, which clinically necessitates a continued immunosuppression to maintain graft survival. They are found to express conformational epitopes, such as MHC molecules, as nonself antigens, which activates both B and T cells.

== Alternatives and Variations ==
=== T cell–inflamed GEP or Tumor Inflammation Signature (TIS) ===
An 18-gene Gene Expression Profile that predicted response to pembrolizumab across multiple solid tumors. Can be used with a platform such as the NanoString nCounter platform and define tumor type–independent dimensions of the tumor microenvironment relevant to predicting clinical outcome for agents targeting the PD-1/PD-L1 signaling pathway.

Gene Signature : CCL5, CD27, CD274 (PD-L1), CD276 (B7-H3), CD8A, CMKLR1, CXCL9, CXCR6, HLA-DQA1, HLA-DRB1, HLA-E, IDO1, LAG3, NKG7, PDCD1LG2 (PDL2), PSMB10, STAT1, and TIGIT.

=== Cytolytic Activity Score (CYT) ===
A simple 2 gene mean expression score of GZMA and PRF1 expression. High CYT within colorectal cancer is associated with improved survival, likely due to increased immunity and cytolytic activity of T cells and M1 macrophages. The 5-year recurrence-free survival of liver cancer patients with low CYT scores was significantly shorter than that of patients with high CYT scores.

=== 3-lncRNA Signature ===
researchers found 20 different 20 lnc-RNA prognostic signatures that showed a stronger effect on overall survival than the ICR signature in different solid cancers. They also found a 3 lncRNA signature that displayed prognostic significance in 5 solid cancer types with a stronger association to clinical outcome than ICR and displayed addition prognostic significance in the uterine cohort, endometrial carcinoma, cervical squamous cell carcinomam and endocervical adenocarcinoma as compared to ICR.
