= CCL5 =

Mammalian protein found in humans

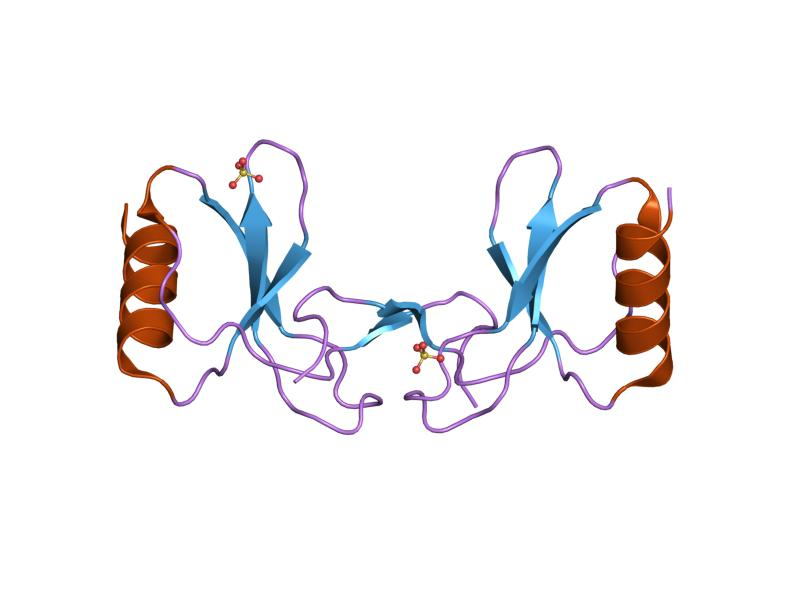

Identifiers
- Aliases: CCL5, D17S136E, RANTES, SCYA5, SIS-delta, SISd, TCP228, eoCP, C-C motif chemokine ligand 5
- External IDs: OMIM: 187011; MGI: 98262; GeneCards: CCL5
Available structures
PDB	Ortholog search: PDBe RCSB
PDB	List of PDB id codes 1B3A, 1EQT, 1HRJ, 1RTN, 1RTO, 1U4L, 1U4M, 1U4P, 1U4R, 2L9H, 2VXW, 5CMD, 5DNF, 5COY

Gene location (Human)
Chr.	Chromosome 17 (human)
Band	17q12	Start	35,871,491 bp
Band	17q12	End	35,880,793 bp

Gene location (Mouse)
Chr.	Chromosome 11 (mouse)
Band	11 C|11 50.66 cM	Start	83,416,604 bp
Band	11 C|11 50.66 cM	End	83,421,344 bp
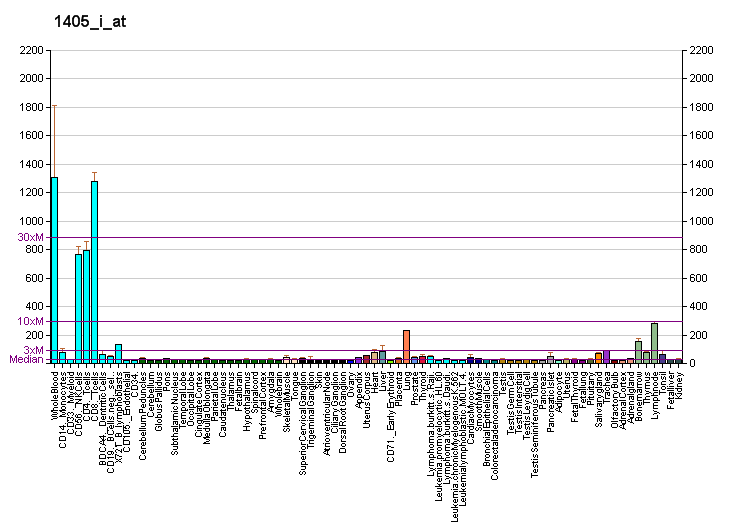

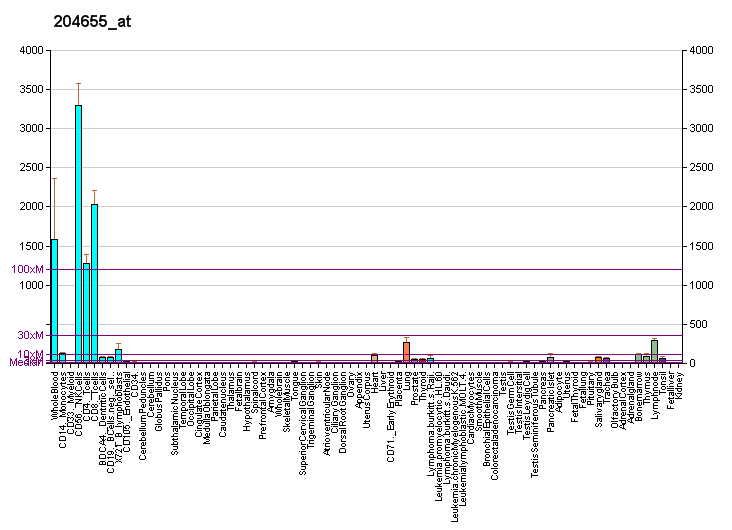
RNA expression pattern
Bgee	Human / Mouse (ortholog); Top expressed in: granulocyte; monocyte; blood; lymph node; spleen; gallbladder; duodenum; epithelium of colon; appendix; bone marrow / Top expressed in: mesenteric lymph nodes; spleen; superior surface of tongue; thymus; blood; jejunum; duodenum; subcutaneous adipose tissue; Paneth cell; right lung; More reference expression data
BioGPS	More reference expression data
Gene ontology
Molecular function	CCR5 chemokine receptor binding; receptor signaling protein tyrosine kinase activator activity; chemokine activity; protein self-association; CCR4 chemokine receptor binding; phosphatidylinositol phospholipase C activity; protein kinase activity; cytokine activity; CCR1 chemokine receptor binding; phospholipase activator activity; chemokine receptor binding; protein homodimerization activity; chemokine receptor antagonist activity; protein binding; chemoattractant activity; identical protein binding; CCR chemokine receptor binding
Cellular component	cytoplasm; extracellular region; extracellular space
Biological process	leukocyte cell-cell adhesion; positive regulation of cell-cell adhesion mediated by integrin; regulation of T cell activation; positive regulation of smooth muscle cell migration; activation of phospholipase D activity; negative regulation of viral genome replication; positive regulation of ERK1 and ERK2 cascade; positive regulation of innate immune response; cellular response to interferon-gamma; positive regulation of macrophage chemotaxis; calcium ion transport; exocytosis; positive regulation of calcium ion transport; response to cytokine; regulation of insulin secretion; chemokine-mediated signaling pathway; positive regulation of cellular biosynthetic process; response to virus; positive regulation of monocyte chemotaxis; cellular response to fibroblast growth factor stimulus; neutrophil chemotaxis; response to tumor necrosis factor; negative regulation of T cell apoptotic process; positive regulation of GTPase activity; negative regulation of macrophage apoptotic process; positive regulation of T cell proliferation; positive regulation of phosphorylation; inflammatory response; positive regulation of translational initiation; response to toxic substance; positive regulation of epithelial cell proliferation; positive regulation of tyrosine phosphorylation of STAT protein; cellular response to organic cyclic compound; cellular calcium ion homeostasis; protein tetramerization; chemotaxis; positive regulation of homotypic cell-cell adhesion; cellular response to interleukin-1; immune response; positive regulation of viral genome replication; positive regulation of receptor signaling pathway via JAK-STAT; lipopolysaccharide-mediated signaling pathway; positive regulation of T cell migration; regulation of chronic inflammatory response; positive regulation of smooth muscle cell proliferation; neutrophil activation; protein kinase B signaling; positive regulation of cell migration; positive regulation of natural killer cell chemotaxis; cell-cell signaling; eosinophil chemotaxis; dendritic cell chemotaxis; MAPK cascade; macrophage chemotaxis; positive regulation of T cell chemotaxis; regulation of neuron death; positive regulation of phosphatidylinositol 3-kinase signaling; negative regulation of G protein-coupled receptor signaling pathway; positive regulation of T cell apoptotic process; positive regulation of cell adhesion; negative regulation of chemokine-mediated signaling pathway; monocyte chemotaxis; positive chemotaxis; positive regulation of protein tyrosine kinase activity; cellular response to tumor necrosis factor; positive regulation of activation of Janus kinase activity; regulation of signaling receptor activity; G protein-coupled receptor signaling pathway; cytokine-mediated signaling pathway; lymphocyte chemotaxis
Sources:Amigo / QuickGO
Orthologs
Databases	NCBI: entry; OMA: entry
Species	Human	Mouse
Entrez	6352	20304
Ensembl	ENSG00000271503; ENSG00000274233	ENSMUSG00000035042
UniProt	P13501	P30882
RefSeq (mRNA)	NM_002985; NM_001278736	NM_013653
RefSeq (protein)	NP_001265665; NP_002976	NP_038681
Location (UCSC)	Chr 17: 35.87 – 35.88 Mb	Chr 11: 83.42 – 83.42 Mb
PubMed search
- Wikidata
View/Edit Human	View/Edit Mouse

Chemokine (C-C motif) ligand 5 (also CCL5) is a protein which in humans is encoded by the CCL5 gene. The gene was discovered in 1990 by in situ hybridisation, and it is localised on the 17q11.2-q12 chromosome.

It is also known as RANTES (regulated on activation, normal T-cell expressed and secreted). RANTES was first described by Tom Schall, who named the protein; it originated from the Argentine film Man Facing Southeast about an alien named Rantés, and the acronym was created to fit the name.

== Function ==
CCL5 belongs to the CC subfamily of chemokines, due to its adjacent cysteines near N terminus. It is an 8kDa protein acting as a classical chemotactic cytokine or chemokine. It consists of 68 amino acids. CCL5 is proinflammatory chemokine, recruiting leukocytes to the site of inflammation. It is chemotactic for T cells, eosinophils, and basophils, but also for monocytes, natural-killer (NK) cells, dendritic cells and mastocytes. With the help of particular cytokines (i.e., IL-2 and IFN-γ) that are released by T cells, CCL5 also induces the proliferation and activation of certain NK cells to form CHAK (CC-Chemokine-activated killer) cells. It is also an HIV-suppressive factor released from CD8+ T cells

The chemokine CCL5 is mainly expressed by T-cells and monocytes, and it has not been shown to be expressed by B-cells. Moreover, it is abundantly expressed by epithelial cells, fibroblasts and thrombocytes. Although it can bind to receptors CCR1, CCR3, CCR4 and CCR5, belonging to seven transmembrane G-protein coupled receptor (GPCRs) family, it has the highest affinity to the CCR5. CCR5 is presented on the surface of T-cells, smooth muscle endothelial cells, epithelial cells, parenchymal cells and other cell types. After the binding of CCL5 to CCR5, phosphoinositide 3-kinase (PI3K) is phosphorylated and subsequently, the phosphorylated PI3K phosphorylates protein kinase B (PKB; also known as Akt) on the serine 473. Then, the Akt/PKB complex phosphorylates and inactivates a serine/threonine protein kinase GSK-3. After the CCL5/CCR5 binding, some other proteins are regulated as well. Bcl2 is more expressed and it induces apoptosis. Beta-catenin is phosphorylated and degraded. An important protein in the cell cycle, Cyclin D, is inhibited by inactivated GSK-3.

CCL5 was first identified in a search for genes expressed "late" (3–5 days) after T cell activation. It was subsequently determined to be a CC chemokine and expressed in more than 100 human diseases. RANTES expression is regulated in T lymphocytes by Kruppel like factor 13 (KLF13). The CCL5 gene is activated after 3–5 days after activation of T-cell via TCR. This is different from the most of other chemokines which are released almost immediately after cell stimulation. Thus, CCL5 is involved in inflammation maintaining. It also induces expression of matrix metalloproteinases which are important for migration of cells into the site of inflammation. CCL5 may be also expressed by NK cells. SP1 transcription factor binds near to CCL5 gene and mediates its constitutive mRNA transcription. The transcription factor is regulated by the JNK/MAPK pathway. Memory CD8+ T-cells are able to secrete CCL5 immediately after TCR stimulation, because they have a large number of preformed CCL5 mRNA in cytoplasm and its secretion is dependent only on translation.

RANTES, along with the related chemokines MIP-1alpha and MIP-1beta, has been identified as a natural HIV-suppressive factor secreted by activated CD8+ T cells and other immune cells. The RANTES protein has been engineered for in vivo production by Lactobacillus bacteria, and this solution is being developed into a possible HIV entry-inhibiting topical microbicide.

== Interactions ==
CCL5 has been shown to interact with CCR3, CCR5 and CCR1.

CCL5 also activates the G-protein coupled receptor GPR75.

CCL5 has two mechanisms of action according to its concentration.

- The first one occurs at low concentration of the chemokine. CCL5 may act as a monomer or a dimer. Dimerization is not necessary for binding to CCR5. Thus, CCL5 in nanomolar concentration acts as classical chemokine and binds to its receptor. For the acting as classical chemokine and for the dimerization, N terminus of the molecule is important.
- The second one occurs at high concentration of the chemokine. CCL5 creates self-aggregates binding to glycosaminoglycans (GAGs) on the cell surface. For that, Glu66 and Glu26 are important. These amino acids are presented on the protein surface and allows ion interactions. In the experiment where these molecules were exchanged for serine, the self-aggregation did not occur. In vitro, the self-aggregates are strong activators of leukocytes. They can act as mitogens and they are not dependent on binding to the receptor. Activated T-cells (or other cells, for instance monocytes or neutrophils) either proliferate or perform apoptosis, and they release proinflammatory cytokines, such as IL-2, IL-5 and IFN-γ. CCL5 mediated apoptosis in T-cells includes release of cytochrome c in cytoplasm and the activation of caspase-9 and caspase-3. The apoptosis is dependent on GAGs binding on cell surface and there is a requirement of at least 4 CCL5 molecules to induce the apoptosis.

== Clinical significance ==
CCL5 is involved in transplantations, anti-viral immunity, tumor development and numerous human diseases and disorders, for instance viral hepatitis or COVID-19.

For instance, CCL5 level is higher during rejection of renal transplant.

Importance of CCL5 is proved by various microbial strategies to avoid the activity of chemokine. For instance, human cytomegalovirus (HCMV) express a viral chemokine receptor analogue US28, which sequesters CCL5. The chemokine is released by virus-specific activated CD8+ T-cells together with perforin and granzyme A. In cytotoxic T-cells (CTL) killing other cells via Fas/FasL interaction, CCL5 increases HIV-specific T-cell cytotoxicity. Moreover, it is considered that CCL5 in low concentration might inhibit HIV replication. It binds to CCR5 (as well as 2 other chemokines) on the surface of CD4+ T-cells. CCR5 is used by HIV as an entrance molecule to a cell. On the contrary, CCL5 in high concentration might increase HIV replication. The chemokine is involved also in antiviral response against other viruses. For instance, it has been shown that CCL5 is highly expressed in mice infected by lymphocytic choriomeningitis virus. In CCL5 knock-out mice, virus-specific CD8+ T cells had reduced cytotoxic ability, reduced cytokines production and enhanced production of inhibitory molecules. It underscores the importance of CCL5 during chronic viral infection.

Increased levels of CCL5 was discovered in lots of cancers. For instance in breast cancer, hepatocellular carcinoma, stomach cancer, prostate cancer and pancreatic cancer.

CCL5 plays an important role in various human disorders, such as atherosclerosis, COVID-19, SARS, atopic dermatitis, asthma, glomerulonephritis, alcohol liver disease, acute liver failure and viral hepatitis.

== See also ==
- Chemotaxis
- Chemokine
