= Centre d'immunologie de Marseille-Luminy =

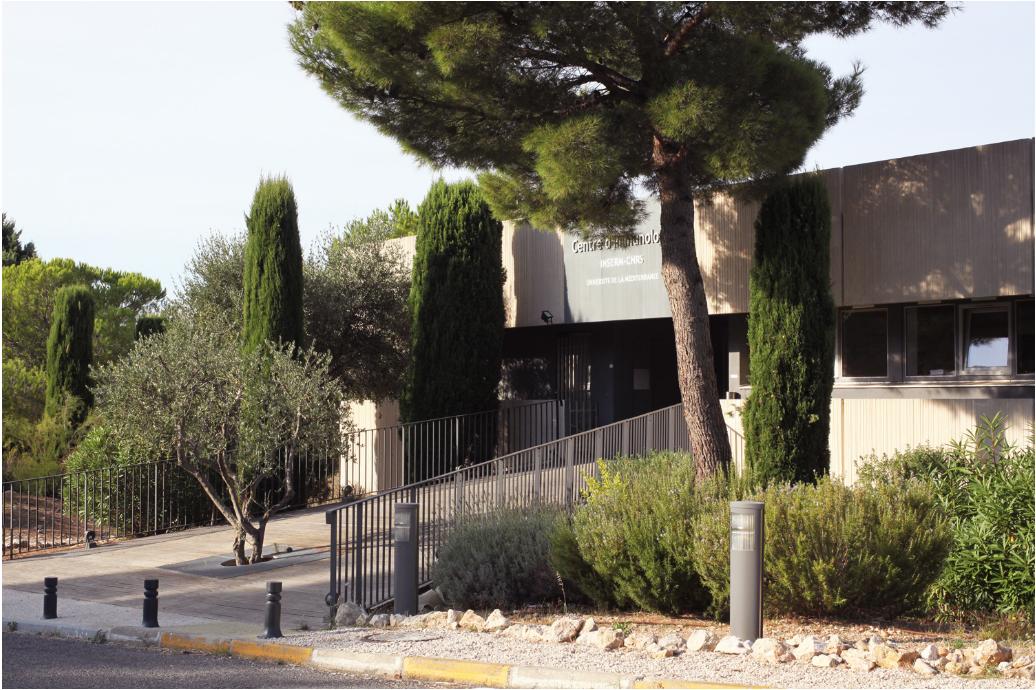
The CIML.

The Centre d'Immunologie de Marseille-Luminy (CIML) was founded in 1976 and has been described by AERES, an independent evaluation agency, as "without doubt one of the best immunology centers of excellence in Europe". The CIML addresses all areas of contemporary immunology; it is located in Marseille in the South of France.

== Function ==
The institute has 17 research teams, with 250 staff including 185 scientists, students, and post-docs from 24 countries. It offers Masters and PhD programs.

The CIML has 90 academic collaborations and 21 industrial partners in France, Europe, and worldwide, and has formed several spin-offs, including: Innate Pharma, Ipsogen (Quiagen), and Immunotech (Beckman-Coulter).

The institute has published over 400 scientific publications in the last 5 years, including 145 in journals with an impact factor ≥ 10.

It is located on a science campus that is home to more than 1,500 researchers and 10,000 students, and 15 biotech companies.

== Directors ==
- François Kourilsky, 1976–1977
- Michel Fougerau 1978–1980
- François Kourilsky, 1981–1984
- Pierre Golstein, 1985-1988
- Bertrand Jordan, 1989–1990
- Michel Pierres, 1991–1994
- Bernard Malissen, 1995-2005
- Jean Pierre Gorvel 2006-2008
- Eric Vivier, 2008 - 2017
- Philippe Pierre 2018-2023
- Marc Dalod 2024-2025
- Pierre Milpied 2025-

== Advances in immunology made through discoveries at the CIML ==
Early work at CIML was centered on T cells. The study of their antigen receptors lead to the discovery of chromosomal inversion during the formation of the T cell receptor (TCR). Researchers at the CIML also published the first nucleotide sequence of a gene encoding a human major histocompatibility complex (MHC) gene and described how the TCR recognizes its MHC ligand. The functions of these T cells were also investigated, leading in particular to the identification of Granzyme A and GZMB (then called CTLA-1 and CTLA-3) and the demonstration of their playing a role in the perforin-granzyme-based mechanism of T-cell-mediated cytotoxicity, and to the discovery of the second, Fas ligand/Fas receptor based pathway of cytotoxicity. Other biologically important regulatory molecules identified at the CIML include interleukins such as interleukin-17 (as CTLA-8) and cell surface molecules, such as CTLA-4 regulating T cells. Subsequently, research at the CIML expanded to other cells of the immune system, including B cells, dendritic cells and natural killer cells, as well as other models systems, such as C. elegans. CIML researchers identified the immunoreceptor tyrosine-based inhibitory motif (ITIM)-containing KARAP/DAP12 that is important for NK cell function and characterized the key function of the killer activated receptor NKp46. Other recent advances include the discovery of early precursors of B-cell follicular lymphoma in apparently healthy individuals, and of dendritic cell aggresome-like induced structures (DALIS) in dendritic cells, thought to play an important role in regulating antigen presentation, as well as the discovery of MafB/M-CSF circuits in hematopoietic stem cell commitment, and macrophages.

== Current research teams ==
- Immunobiology of stromal cell

Marc Bajénoff

- Innate immunity at mucosal sites

Achille Broggi

- Dendritic cells and antiviral defence

Marc Dalod

- Affinities in the immune repertoire

Thomas Dupic

- B cell Immunity to Infection

Mauro Gaya

- Membrane dynamics and T lymphocyte signaling

Hai-Tao He & Didier Marguet

- Immune tolerance and T cell differentiation

Magali Irla

- Inflammation biology group

Toby Lawrence

- Integrative B cell immunology

Pierre Milpied

- Genomic instability and human hemopathies

Sandrine Roulland

- Dendritic cell biology

Philippe Pierre

- Integrative biology of T cells

Romain Roncagalli

- Immunosurveillance of the central nervous system

Rejane Rua

- Innate lymphoid cells and Neural Regulation of Immunity

Sophie Ugolini

- Development of the immune system

Serge Van De Pavert

- Innate lymphoid cells

Eric Vivier

== Funding ==
The CIML is mainly supported by direct and indirect funding from INSERM, the CNRS, and Aix-Marseille University, covering for example the salaries of more than 125 permanent staff members. Other major funders include the European Research Council, European Union, the Agence Nationale de la Recherche, Association pour la Recherche sur le Cancer, Fondation Recherche Medicale, Human Frontier Science Program, Institut National du Cancer, La Ligue Nationale Contre le Cancer, as well as CIML's industrial partners.

== Education and training ==
The CIML's Master's and PhD program is integrated into the educational framework of Aix-Marseille University. Participation in the CIML program requires enrollment in the Master's-PhD program at the Ecole Doctorale des Sciences de la Vie. A unique part of the program is a student exchange scheme with Harvard Medical School.

== Clinical activities ==
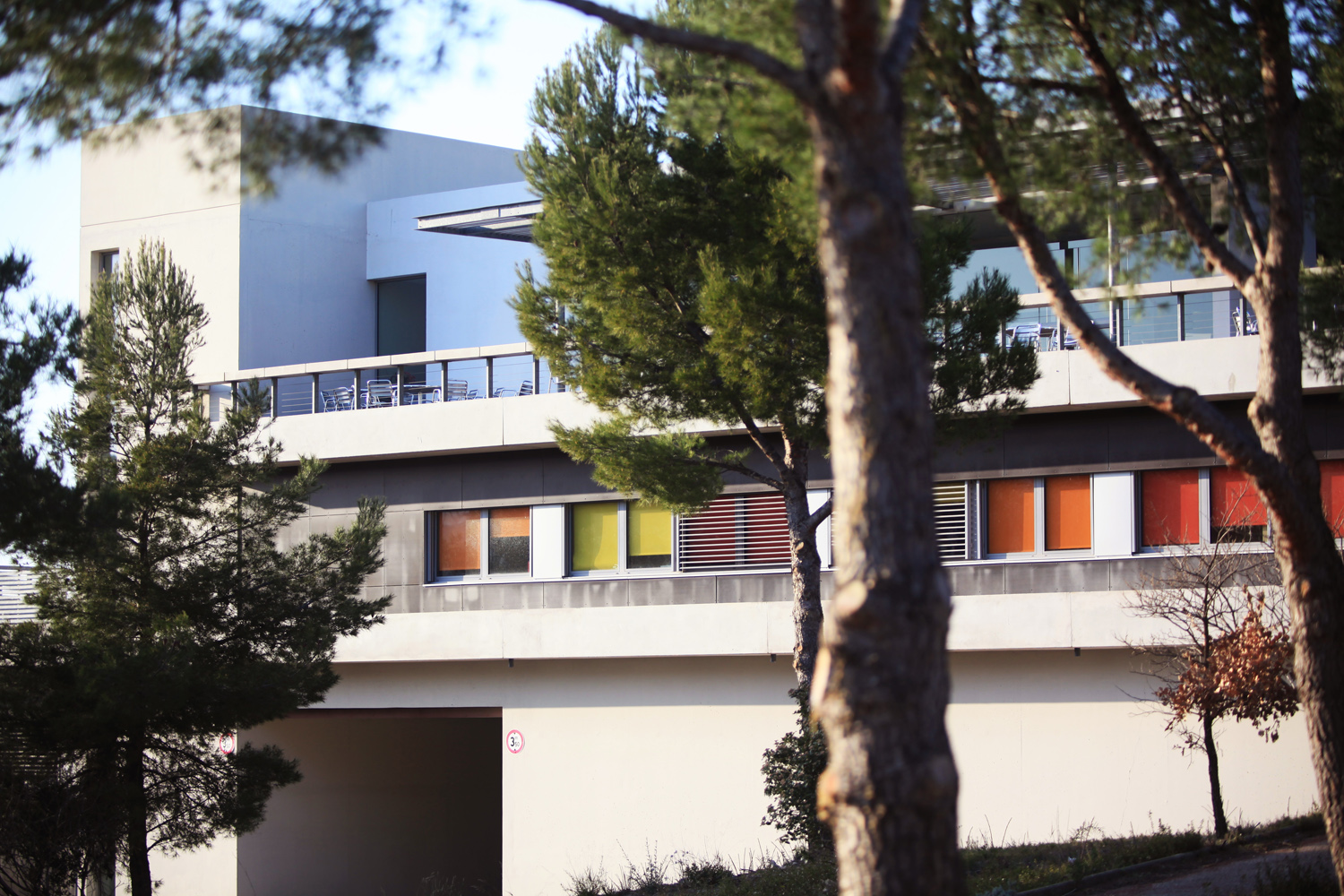

In immunology, more than in any other discipline, physiology is often revealed by pathology. Therefore, the institute is involved in many studies with clinical objectives. A wide range of malignancies are studied at the CIML such as leukemias and hematopoietic cancers, lymphomas and primary immune deficiencies, or brucellosis and juvenile arthritis. Treatments are also a major concern of the institute, such as studies on the prevention, monitoring, and treatment of hematologic malignancies and on the impact of therapies on the immune system. Finally, theoretical work which may provide key solutions to medicine are performed at the CIML on inflammatory mechanisms associated with the development of inflammatory bowel disease.
