= Active immunotherapy =

- Specialty: Immunology

Active immunotherapy is a type of immunotherapy that aims to stimulate the host's immune system or a specific immune response to a disease or pathogen and is most commonly used in cancer treatments. Active immunotherapy is also used for treatment of neurodegenerative disorders, such as Alzheimer's disease, Parkinson's disease, prion disease, and multiple sclerosis. Active immunotherapies induce an immune response through direct immune system stimulation, while immunotherapies that administer antibodies directly to the system are classified as passive immunotherapies. Active immunotherapies can elicit generic and specific immune responses depending on the goal of the treatment. The categories of active immunotherapy divide into:

- Non-specific active immunotherapy: generating a general immune system response using cytokines and other cell signaling molecules.
- Specific active immunotherapy: the generation of cell-mediated and antibody immune responses focused on specific antigens expressed by the cancer cells, typically using a vaccine platform.

Active immunotherapies fall under the category of activation immunotherapies, which is a subset of immunotherapies that activate the immune system as opposed immunotherapies that suppress the immune system.

== Non-specific active immunotherapy ==
Non-specific active immunotherapy is administered with the overall goal of generally eliminating malignant pathogens or cells from the host system. This treatment stimulates the immune system in a general sense, rather than specifically targeting a cell type e.g. cancer cells. Non-specific approaches aim to create a robust immune response that would lead to the eventual killing of malignant cells through immunomodulators such as cytokines.

=== Cytokines ===
Immunomodulating agents regulate the immune system's response and are produced by various immune cells. These agents include the following agents and markers:

Class	Examples
Cytokines	Ig, Interferons, TNF
Chemokines	CXC, CC, CX3C, XC
Interleukins	IL-2, IL-7, 1L-10, 1L-12

=== BCG Vaccine ===
The BCG vaccine has been used against tuberculosis, mycobacteria, and various cancers in the form of vaccination as an initial immune system stimulant. In cancer, the anti-tumor immunological effects are elicited by the host's immune response and the BCG infection against the tumor cells, most commonly in bladder cancer. The immune activation allows for further recognition and elimination of malignant tumor cells.

== Specific active immunotherapy ==
Specific active immunotherapy administers a specific antigen as the therapy. The therapy allows the host to create an antigen-specific response with the development of antibodies, proliferation of cytotoxic T lymphocyte responses, or both, directed at the desired pathogen or malignant tumor cell in the case of cancer therapy.

=== Vaccine Therapies ===
Vaccine therapies are a type of specific active immunotherapy. Vaccine therapies deliver various agents that will lead to a specific immune response e.g. antibody development or CTL response. Tumor antigens have been a main target in specific active immunotherapy by way of vaccination. Tumor antigens are antigens produced by tumor cells and can be common among patients with the same cancer-type, or unique to a particular patient. Their specificity to malignant tumor cells makes tumor antigens ideal candidates for vaccination.

== See also ==
- Cancer vaccine
- C-Met#Active immunotherapy,
- Mantle cell lymphoma § Immunotherapy,
