= Tumor-infiltrating lymphocytes =

White blood cells that have migrated to a tumor

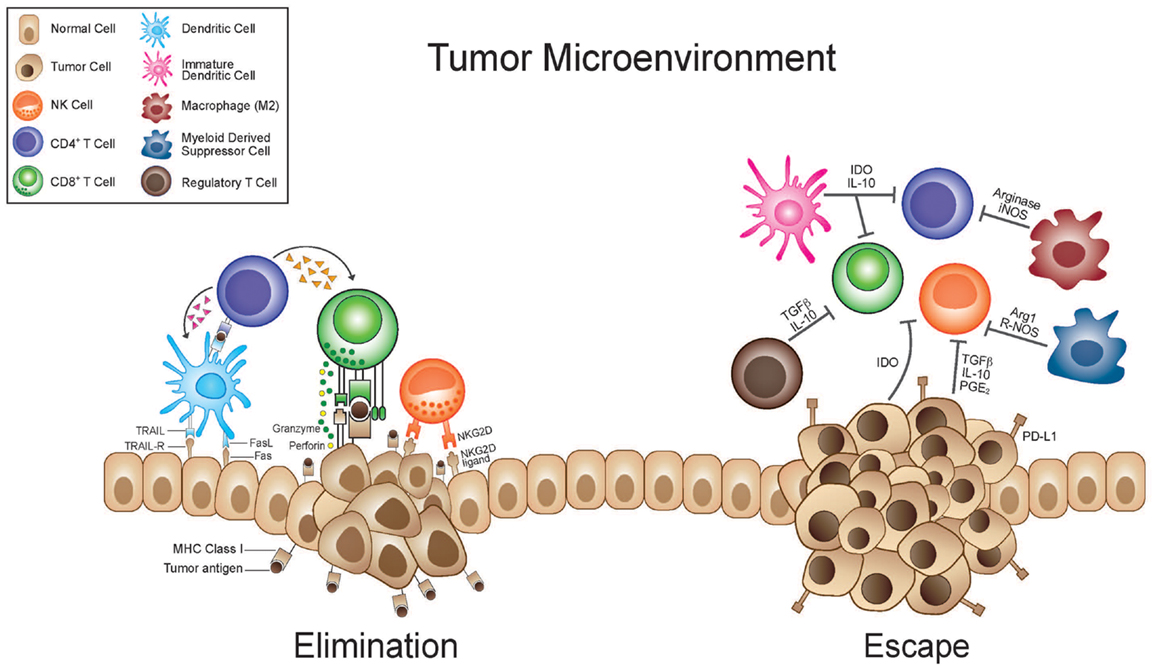
During the elimination phase immune effector cells such as CTL's and NK cells with the help of dendritic and CD4+ T-cells are able to recognize and eliminate tumor cells.

Tumor-infiltrating lymphocytes (TIL) are white blood cells that have left the bloodstream and migrated towards a tumor. They include T cells and B cells, and are part of the larger category of 'tumor-infiltrating immune cells', which consist of both mononuclear and polymorphonuclear immune cells (i.e., T cells, B cells, natural killer cells, macrophages, neutrophils, dendritic cells, mast cells, eosinophils, basophils, etc.) in variable proportions. Their abundance varies with tumor type and stage, and in some cases relates to disease prognosis.

TILs can often be found in the tumor stroma and within the tumor itself. Their functions can change dynamically throughout tumor progression and in response to anticancer therapy.

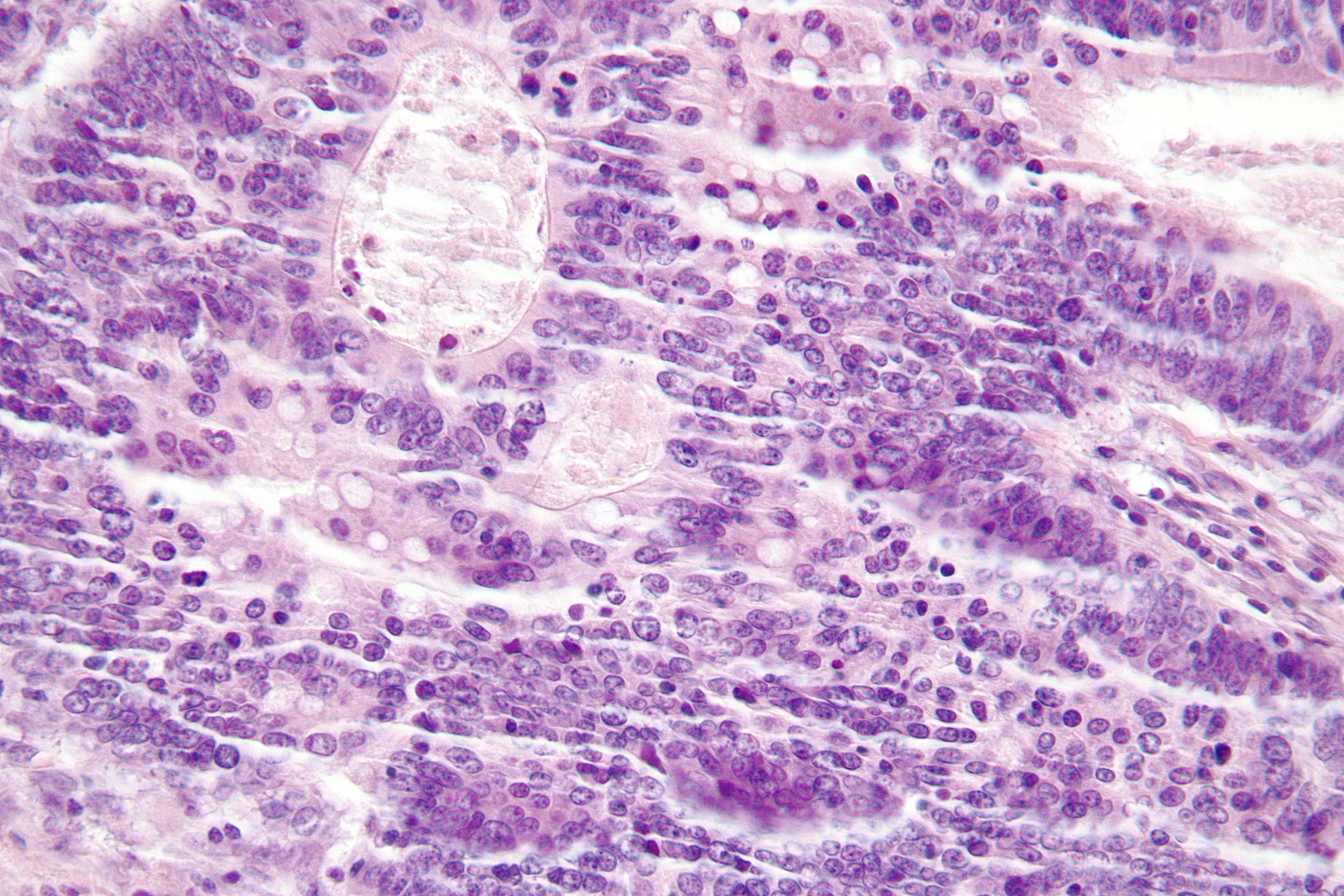
Very high magnification micrograph of tumor infiltrating lymphocytes, abbreviated TILs, in a case of colorectal carcinoma. H&E stain.

TILs are implicated in killing tumor cells. The presence of lymphocytes in tumors is often associated with better clinical outcomes (after surgery or immunotherapy).

== Detection and characteristics ==
Histologic definitions for what constitutes a TIL vary. Some authors define TILs as existing only between tumor cells, excluding lymphocytes in the surrounding stroma. Other researchers consider both TILs within the tumor (intratumoral TILs) and TILs in the surrounding stroma to have clinical significance.

CD3 has been used to detect lymphocytes in tumor samples. Tumor immune infiltration can also be determined using gene expression methods like microarray or RNA sequencing or through deconvolution methods such as CIBERSORT. Such methods allow for systematic TIL enumeration and characterization of the tumor microenvironment in diverse cancer types and across thousands of tumors, an approach largely led by Ash Alizadeh, Ajit Johnson among others. Detection of gene expression specific to different kinds of immune cell populations can then be used to determine the degree of lymphocyte infiltration as has been shown in breast cancer. An active immune environment within the tumor often indicates a better prognosis as can be determined by the immunologic constant of rejection.

== Use in autologous cell therapy ==
They are key to an experimental autologous cell therapy (Contego) for metastatic melanoma. Autologous TIL therapy for metastatic melanoma has broad T cell recognition of both defined and undefined tumor antigens against all human leukocyte antigen (HLA) restrictions. TILs can not only recognize over-expressed self/melanocyte differentiation antigens, such as Melan-A/MART-1 (melanoma-specific), gp100, tyrosinase, and survivin, but TILs can also recognize other unknown antigens specific to the tumor and individual patient.

== Use in adoptive T cell transfer therapy ==
=== History ===
The use of TILs as an adoptive cell transfer therapy to treat cancer was pioneered by Steven Rosenberg and colleagues at the Surgery Branch of the National Cancer Institute (NCI). Rosenberg and colleagues have conducted clinical trials for more than two decades using TIL adoptive cell therapy for melanoma. TIL adoptive cell therapy is now a routine regimen in centers across the world, including MD Anderson Cancer Center, where the objective response rates originally observed at the NCI have been reproduced. Several centers currently have established TIL therapy protocols for the treatment of melanoma, including the MD Anderson Cancer Center in Houston, Texas, Ella Institute in Sheba Hospital, Israel, and Copenhagen University Hospital in Herlev, Denmark.

=== Process ===
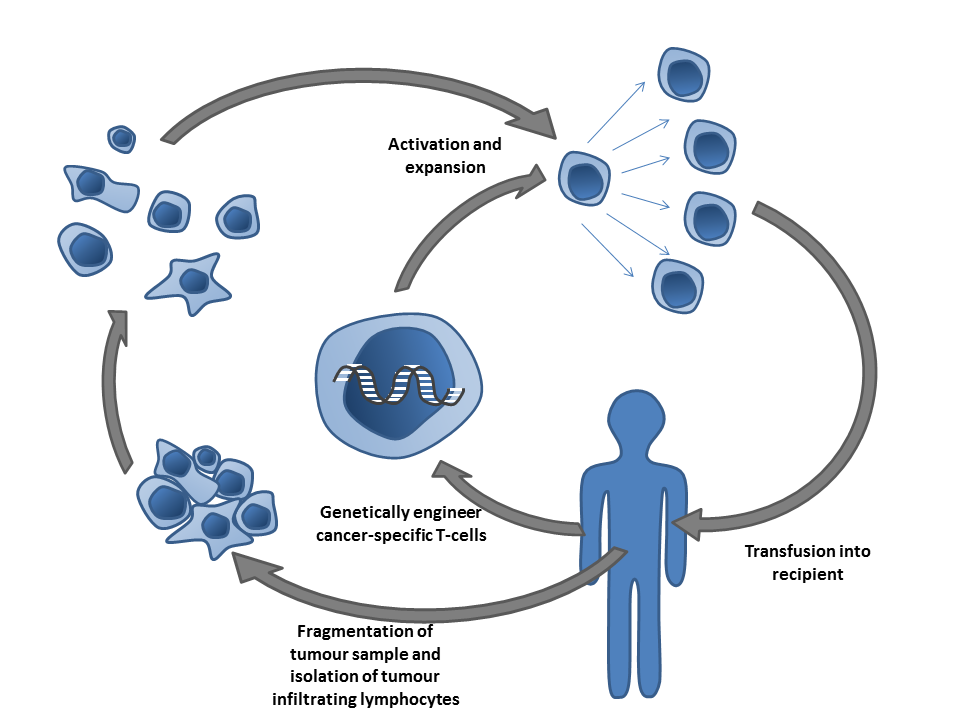
Cancer-specific T-cells can be obtained by fragmentation and isolation of tumor-infiltrating lymphocytes, or by genetically engineering cells from peripheral blood. The cells are activated and grown prior to transfusion into the recipient (tumor bearer).

In adoptive T cell transfer therapy, TILs are expanded ex vivo from surgically resected tumors that have been cut into small fragments or from single-cell suspensions isolated from the tumor fragments. Multiple individual cultures are established, grown separately, and assayed for specific tumor recognition. TILs are expanded over the course of a few weeks with a high dose of IL-2 in 24-well plates. Selected TIL lines that present the best tumor reactivity are then further expanded in a "rapid expansion protocol" (REP), which uses anti-CD3 activation for a typical period of two weeks. The final post-REP TIL is infused back into the patient. The process can also involve a preliminary chemotherapy regimen to deplete endogenous lymphocytes in order to provide the adoptively transferred TILs with enough access to the surrounding tumor sites. This chemotherapy regimen is given 7 days before the expanded TIL infusion. This involves pretreatment with a combination of fludarabine and cyclophosphamide. Lympho-depletion is thought to eliminate the negative effects of other lymphocytes that may compete for growth factors and decrease anti-tumor effects of the TILs, depleting regulatory or inhibitory lymphocyte populations.

=== Clinical Success ===
The combination of TILs with a high dose of IL-2 has been evaluated in multiple clinical trials, with response rates of 50% or more. In summary of TIL therapy clinical trials, TIL therapy was found to induce complete and durable regression of metastatic melanoma. Tumor reduction of 50% or more was observed in about half of patients. Some patients experienced complete responses with no detectable tumor remaining years after treatment. In one clinical trial, among the 93 patients treated with TILs, 19 patients had complete remissions that lasted greater than 3 years.

In a randomized phase III trial conducted between 2014 and 2022 in Denmark and the Netherlands, researchers found that treatment with TILs was superior to ipilimumab in patients with metastatic melanoma.

Clinical trials using TILs to treat digestive tract cancers, such as colorectal cancer, and cancers associated with the human papilloma virus (HPV), such as cervical cancer, are ongoing. In colorectal cancer, TILs are associated with microsatellite instability cancers, as may be seen in Lynch syndrome. Also, TILs are associated with most effective immune checkpoint inhibitor therapy in GI cancers. They are an important prognostic factor in melanoma and higher levels are associated with a better outcome. TILs are also associated with better outcomes in epithelial ovarian cancer.

The use of TILs to treat other tumor types, including lung, ovarian, bladder, and breast, is under investigation.

== Associations with cancer treatments ==
TIL therapy in combination with prior immunotherapy treatment, such as IL-2 and anti-CTLA4 (ipilimumab) had higher response rates and more durable responses in clinical trials. This suggests a synergistic effect of prior immunotherapy with TIL therapy. Current studies involve investigating the roles of chemotherapy drugs in combination with TIL therapy to assess improved response rates and synergistic efficacy.

== See also ==
- Lymphocyte
- Tumor-Infiltrating Dendritic Cell
- Cancer immunotherapy
- CAR T-Cell therapy
