= Granzyme B =

Serine protease enzyme

Identifiers
- EC no.: 3.4.21.79
- CAS no.: 143180-74-9

Databases
- BRENDA: enzyme data
- ExPASy: NiceZyme view
- KEGG: enzyme entry
- MetaCyc: metabolic pathway
- Rhea: reactions
- PDB structures: RCSB PDB PDBe PDBsum
Search
- PMC: articles
- PubMed: articles
- NCBI: proteins

Granzyme B (GrB) is one of the serine protease granzymes most commonly found in the granules of natural killer cells (NK cells) and cytotoxic T cells. It is secreted by these cells along with the pore forming protein perforin to mediate apoptosis in target cells.

Granzyme B has also been found to be produced by a wide range of non-cytotoxic cells ranging from basophils and mast cells to smooth muscle cells. The secondary functions of granzyme B are also numerous. Granzyme B has shown to be involved in inducing inflammation by stimulating cytokine release and is also involved in extracellular matrix remodelling.

Elevated levels of granzyme B are also implicated in a number of autoimmune diseases, several skin diseases, and type 1 diabetes.

== Structure ==
In humans, granzyme B is encoded by GZMB on chromosome 14q11.2, which is 3.2kb long and consists of 5 exons. It is one of the most abundant granzymes of which there are 5 in humans and 10 in mice. Granzyme B is thought to have evolved from a granzyme H related precursor and is more effective at lower concentrations than the other granzymes.

The enzyme is initially in an inactive precursor zymogen form, with an additional amino terminal peptide sequence. This sequence can be cleaved by cathepsin C, removing 2 amino acids. Cathepsin H has also been reported to activate granzyme B.

Granzyme B's structure consists of two six-stranded β sheets with three trans domain segments. In the granules of cytotoxic lymphocytes the enzyme can exist in two glycosylated forms. The high mannose form weighs 32kDa and the complex form, 35kDa.

Granzyme B contains the catalytic triad histidine-aspartic acid-serine in its active site and preferentially cleaves after an aspartic acid residue situated in the P1 position. The aspartic acid residue to be cleaved associates with an arginine residue in the enzyme's binding pocket. Granzyme B is active at a neutral pH and is therefore inactive in the acidic CTL granules. The enzyme is also rendered inactive when bound by serglycin in the granules to avoid apoptosis triggering inside the cytotoxic T cells themselves.

== Delivery ==
Granzyme B is released with perforin which inserts into a target cell's plasma membrane forming a pore. Perforin has a radius of 5.5 nm and granzyme B has a stokes radius of 2.5 nm and can therefore pass through the perforin pore into the target to be destroyed.

Alternatively, once released, granzyme B can bind to negatively charged heparan sulfate containing receptors on a target cell and become endocytosed. The vesicles that carry the enzyme inside then burst, exposing granzyme b to the cytoplasm and its substrates. Hsp-70 has also been linked to aiding granzyme B entry.

Granzyme B has also been proposed to enter a target by first exchanging its bound serglycin for negative phospholipids in a target's plasma membrane. Entry then occurs by the less selective process of absorptive pinocytosis.

== Mediated apoptosis ==
Once inside the target cell, granzyme B can cleave and activate initiator caspases 8 and 10, and executioner caspases 3 and 7 which trigger apoptosis. Caspase 7 is the most sensitive to granzyme B and caspases 3, 8, and 10 are only cleaved to intermediate fragments and need further cleavage for full activation.

Granzyme B can also cleave BID leading to BAX/BAK oligomerisation and cytochrome c release from the mitochondria. Granzyme B can cleave ICAD leading to DNA fragmentation and the laddering pattern associated with apoptosis.

Granzyme B has a potential of over 300 substrates and can cleave Mcl-1 in the outer mitochondrial membrane relieving its inhibition of Bim. Bim stimulates BAX/BAK oligomerisation, mitochondrial membrane permeability and apoptosis. Granzyme B can also cleave HAX1 (Hs-1 associated protein X-1) to facilitate mitochondria polarisation.

Granzyme B can also generate a cytotoxic level of mitochondrial reactive oxygen species (ROS) to mediate cell death. The caspase independent pathways of cell death are thought to have arisen to overcome viruses that can inhibit caspases and prevent apoptosis.

== Targets ==
=== Nucleus ===
Granzyme B has many substrates located in the nucleus. Granzyme B can cleave PARP (poly ADP ribose polymerase) and DNA PK (DNA protein kinase) to disrupt DNA repair and retroviral DNA integration. Granzyme B can also cleave nucleophosmin, topoisomerase 1 and nucleolin to prevent viral replication.

Granzyme B can cleave ICP4 from the HSV 1 virus which is an essential protein used for gene transactivation and NUMA (Nuclear mitotic apparatus protein) can be cleaved to prevent mitosis.

Granzyme B can also cleave DBP (DNA Binding Protein) into a 50 kDa fragment and then into an additional 60 kDa indirectly through the caspases it activates.

=== Extracellular matrix ===
Granzyme B can degrade many proteins in the extracellular matrix (ECM) including fibronectin, vitronectin and aggrecan. Cleavage can cause cell death by anoikis and release alarmins from the ECM inducing inflammation. Fragments of fibronectin can attract neutrophils and stimulate MMP expression from chondrocytes. Basophils secrete granzyme B to degrade endothelial cell-cell contacts allowing extravasation to sites of inflammation.

Granzyme B can also induce inflammation by processing cytokines IL-1α and IL18. It can also trigger the release of IL6 and IL8 through activation of PAR1 (Protease activated receptor 1).

Cleavage of vitronectin occurs at the RGD integrin binding site interrupting cell growth signalling pathways. Cleavage of laminin and fibronectin disrupts dermal-epidermal junction attachment and cross talk while decorin destruction by granzyme B causes collagen disorganisation, skin thinning and aging. Keratinocytes can express granzyme B after exposure to UVA and UVB which is linked to photoaging of the skin.

Granzyme B can also impair wound healing. Cleavage of the von Willebrand factor inhibits platelet aggregation and of plasminogen produces an angiostatin fragment preventing angiogenesis. The cutting of fibronectins and vitronectins delays the formation of a provisional matrix impairing wound healing further.

== T cell regulation ==
Granzyme B is secreted by regulatory T cells (tregs) to kill CD4^{+} T cells that have not been exposed to host cells that are restricted to the peripheral tissues and cannot reach the thymus. This activation-induced cell death (AICD) can be achieved without the Fas death pathway and prevents autoimmune reaction to self antigens.

== Inhibitors ==
Granzyme B's most common inhibitor is SERPINB9 also known as proteinase inhibitor nine (PI-9) which is 376 amino acids long and found in the nucleus and cytoplasm. It is produced by many types of cell to protect themselves from accidental granzyme B mediated cell death. PI-9 is metastable and forms an energetically favourable conformation when bound to granzyme B. The reactive loop centre (RCL) of the PI-9 molecule acts as a pseudosubstrate and initially forms a reversible Michaelis complex. Once the peptide bond of the RCL is cleaved between positions P1 and P1', granzyme B is permanently inhibited. However, if the RCL is cleaved efficiently, PI-9 does not act as a 1:1 suicide substrate and granzyme B is left uninhibited. Granzyme M can also cleave PI-9 in the nucleus and cytoplasm to relieve granzyme B of inhibition. Protein L4-100K from adenoviruses can also inhibit granzyme B by binding at exosites and specific binding pockets. L4-100K is an assembly protein that can transport hexon capsomeres into the nucleus of an adenovirus. 100k can be cleaved to a 90kDa fragment by granzyme H to relieve this inhibition which is important in adenovirus 5 infected cells.

== Role in disease ==
Granzyme B has a normal concentration of 20-40 pg/ml in the blood plasma while retaining 70% activity and elevated concentrations of granzyme B are found in a number of disease states. Granzyme B can generate autoantigens by cleaving in disordered regions and linker regions of antigens exposing new epitopes and this can cause the development of autoimmune diseases.

Granzyme B release with perforin from CD8^{+} T cells can cause heart and kidney transplant rejection through killing of allogeneic endothelial cells. The destruction of insulin producing β cells in pancreatic islets is mediated by T cells and granzyme B contributing to Type 1 Diabetes. Granzyme B can also mediate the death of cells after spinal cord injury and is found at elevated levels in rheumatoid arthritis.

Chronic obstructive pulmonary disease (COPD) has been attributed to granzyme B secreted from NK and T cells causing the apoptosis of bronchial epithelial cells. Matrix destabilisation and remodelling by granzyme B is also linked to asthma pathogenesis. Granzyme B can kill melanocytes causing the skin condition vitiligo and granzyme B overexpression is found in contact dermatitis, lichen sclerosus and lichen planus cases.

Cytotoxic cells expressing granzyme B have been identified close to hair follicles linking a possible role in hair loss. The ECM remodelling properties of granzyme B have also implicated its involvement in left ventricular remodelling, which increases the subsequent chances of myocardial infarction. The weakening of the fibrous cap of atheromatous plaques by apoptosis of smooth muscle cells has also been linked to granzyme B.

More recently, a key role for extracellular granzyme B has been forwarded for a number of autoimmune (e.g. arthritis, autoimmune blistering, scleroderma, lupus)(Reviewed in) and/or age-related chronic inflammatory disorders (Photoaging, aneurysm, atherosclerosis, COPD, macular degeneration, etc.)(Reviewed in). In many of these conditions, proof-of-concept has been demonstrated through the use of experimental models, genetic approaches and/or pharmacologic approaches.
