= TSP-1 =

Term TSP-1 may refer to:

- Thrombospondin 1, a protein that in humans in encoded by the THBS1 gene
- Granzyme A, an enzyme class
