= Serglycin =

Protein-coding gene in the species Homo sapiens

SRGN

Identifiers
- Aliases: SRGN, PPG, PRG, PRG1, serglycin
- External IDs: OMIM: 177040; MGI: 97756; GeneCards: SRGN

Gene location (Human)
Chr.	Chromosome 10 (human)
Band	10q22.1	Start	69,088,103 bp
Band	10q22.1	End	69,104,805 bp

Gene location (Mouse)
Chr.	Chromosome 10 (mouse)
Band	10|10 B4	Start	62,329,612 bp
Band	10|10 B4	End	62,363,230 bp
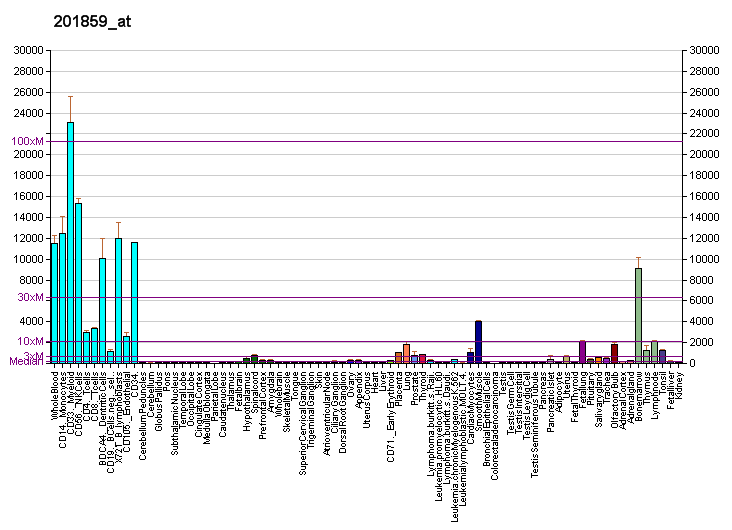

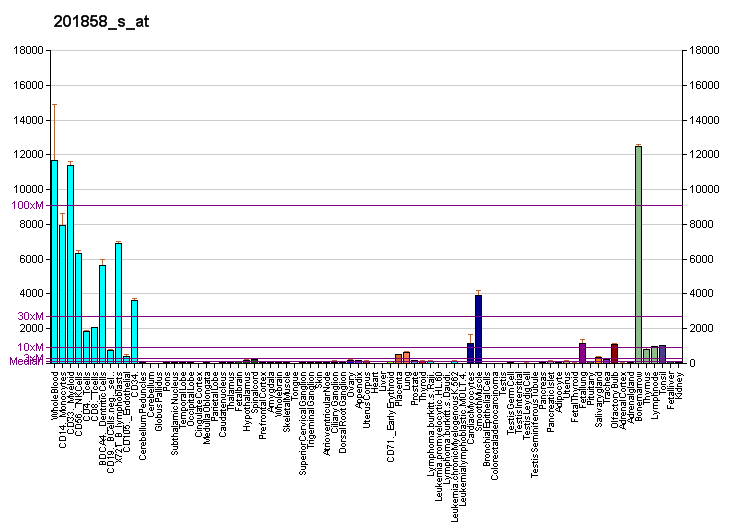
RNA expression pattern
Bgee	Human / Mouse (ortholog); Top expressed in: trabecular bone; bone marrow; monocyte; bone marrow cell; blood; appendix; periodontal fiber; pericardium; endothelial cell; granulocyte / Top expressed in: gastrula; decidua; granulocyte; blood; tibiofemoral joint; right lung lobe; dermis; bone marrow; cervix; spleen; More reference expression data
BioGPS	More reference expression data
Gene ontology
Molecular function	protein binding
Cellular component	Golgi apparatus; extracellular region; platelet alpha granule lumen; extracellular space; mast cell granule; Schaffer collateral - CA1 synapse; glutamatergic synapse; postsynaptic specialization, intracellular component
Biological process	negative regulation of bone mineralization; biomineral tissue development; platelet degranulation; protease localization to mast cell secretory granule; granzyme-mediated apoptotic signaling pathway; apoptotic process; protein processing; mast cell secretory granule organization; T cell secretory granule organization; maintenance of protease location in mast cell secretory granule; maintenance of granzyme B location in T cell secretory granule; modulation of chemical synaptic transmission; regulation of postsynapse organization
Sources:Amigo / QuickGO
Orthologs
Databases	NCBI: entry; OMA: entry
Species	Human	Mouse
Entrez	5552	19073
Ensembl	ENSG00000122862	ENSMUSG00000020077
UniProt	P10124	P13609
RefSeq (mRNA)	NM_002727; NM_001321053; NM_001321054	NM_011157; NM_001358965
RefSeq (protein)	NP_001307982; NP_001307983; NP_002718	NP_035287; NP_001345894
Location (UCSC)	Chr 10: 69.09 – 69.1 Mb	Chr 10: 62.33 – 62.36 Mb
PubMed search
- Wikidata
View/Edit Human	View/Edit Mouse

Serglycin, also known as hematopoietic proteoglycan core protein or secretory granule proteoglycan core protein, is a protein that in humans is encoded by the SRGN gene. It is primarily expressed in hematopoietic cells and endothelial cells, and is the only known intracellular proteoglycan.

== Function ==
This gene encodes a protein best known as a hematopoietic cell granule proteoglycan. Proteoglycans stored in the secretory granules of many hematopoietic cells also contain a protease-resistant peptide core, which may be important for neutralizing hydrolytic enzymes. This encoded protein was found to be associated with the macromolecular complex of granzymes and perforin, and serves as a scaffold for the granzyme and perforin in granule-mediated apoptosis.
