= GZMK =

Protein-coding gene in the species Homo sapiens

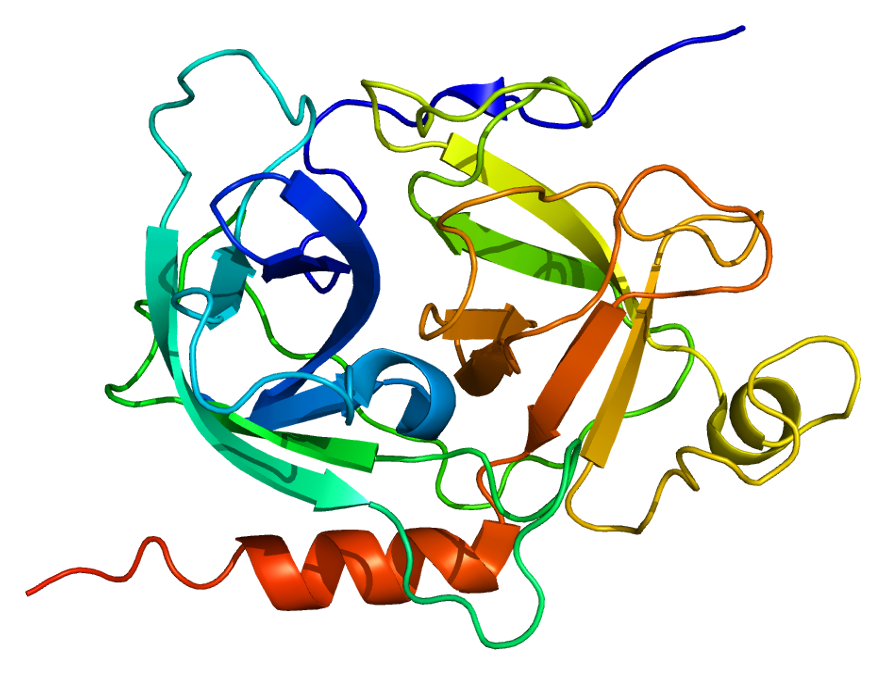

Identifiers
- Aliases: GZMK, TRYP2, granzyme K
- External IDs: OMIM: 600784; MGI: 1298232; GeneCards: GZMK
Available structures
PDB	Ortholog search: PDBe RCSB
PDB	List of PDB id codes 1MZA, 1MZD

Gene location (Human)
Chr.	Chromosome 5 (human)
Band	5q11.2	Start	55,024,256 bp
Band	5q11.2	End	55,034,570 bp

Gene location (Mouse)
Chr.	Chromosome 13 (mouse)
Band	13|13 D2.2	Start	113,308,142 bp
Band	13|13 D2.2	End	113,362,442 bp
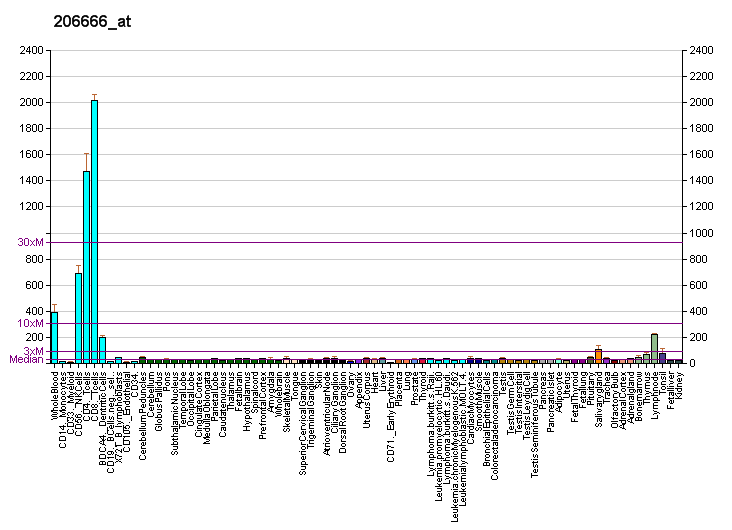
RNA expression pattern
Bgee	Human / Mouse (ortholog); Top expressed in: lymph node; granulocyte; spleen; blood; appendix; testicle; gallbladder; trabecular bone; epithelium of nasopharynx; thymus / Top expressed in: tail of embryo; Region II of hippocampus proper; submandibular gland; supramammillary nucleus; medial amygdaloid nucleus; CA3 field; central amygdaloid nucleus; blood; gastrula; lymph node; More reference expression data
BioGPS	More reference expression data
Gene ontology
Molecular function	peptidase activity; serine-type peptidase activity; hydrolase activity; serine-type endopeptidase activity
Cellular component	extracellular region
Biological process	proteolysis
Sources:Amigo / QuickGO
Orthologs
Databases	NCBI: entry; OMA: entry
Species	Human	Mouse
Entrez	3003	14945
Ensembl	ENSG00000113088	ENSMUSG00000042385
UniProt	P49863	O35205
RefSeq (mRNA)	NM_002104	NM_008196
RefSeq (protein)	NP_002095	NP_032222
Location (UCSC)	Chr 5: 55.02 – 55.03 Mb	Chr 13: 113.31 – 113.36 Mb
PubMed search
- Wikidata
View/Edit Human	View/Edit Mouse

Granzyme K (GrK) is a protein that is encoded by the GZMK gene on chromosome 5 in humans.

== Function ==
Granzymes are a family of serine proteases which have various intracellular and extracellular roles. GrK is found in granules of natural killer (NK) cells and cytotoxic T lymphocytes (CTLs), and is traditionally described as being cytotoxic towards targeted foreign, infected, or cancerous cells. NK cells and CTLs can induce apoptosis through the granule secretory pathway, which involves the secretion of granzymes along with perforin at immunological synapses.

Intracellularly, GrK may cleave a variety of substrates, such as the nucleosome assembly protein (NAP), HMG2, and Ape1 in the ER-associated SET complex, along with other targets that have downstream cytotoxic effects. Compared to in vitro studies of GrK cytotoxicity in rats and humans, in vitro mouse studies show no cytotoxic potential in the absence of perforin, making the role of GrK controversial. In vitro studies show potential extracellular targets for GrK such as the cleavage and activation of protease activated receptors (PAR)-1 and PAR-2. Grk binds lipopolysaccharides (LPS) in vitro separately from GrK's catalytic activity. Both PAR and LPS activation by GrK induce cytokine production in human in vitro studies.

== Clinical significance ==
GrK is important in bacterial and viral infection control. GrK-expressing CD8+ T cells may be associated with inflammation and aging.

GrK may also be able to independently activate the complement system via cleavage of C2 and C4.
