= Granzyme A =

Class of enzymes

Identifiers
- EC no.: 3.4.21.78
- CAS no.: 143180-73-8

Databases
- BRENDA: enzyme data
- ExPASy: NiceZyme view
- KEGG: enzyme entry
- MetaCyc: metabolic pathway
- Rhea: reactions
- PDB structures: RCSB PDB PDBe PDBsum
Search
- PMC: articles
- PubMed: articles
- NCBI: proteins

GZMA
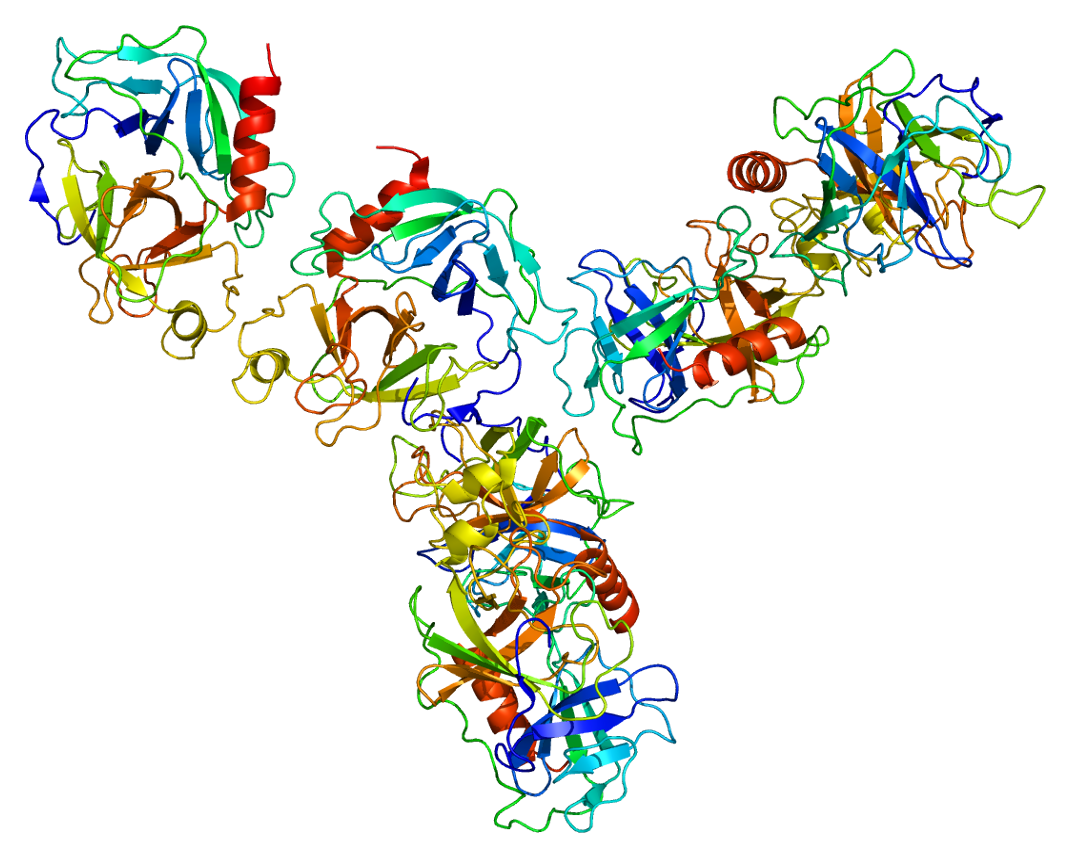

Identifiers
- Aliases: GZMA, CTLA3, HFSP, granzyme A
- External IDs: OMIM: 140050; MGI: 109266; GeneCards: GZMA
Available structures
PDB	Ortholog search: PDBe RCSB
PDB	List of PDB id codes 1OP8, 1ORF
Enzyme activity
EC #	BRENDA	ExPASy	KEGG	MetaCyc
3.4.21.78	↗	↗	↗	↗

Gene location (Human)
Chr.	Chromosome 5 (human)
Band	5q11.2	Start	55,102,646 bp
Band	5q11.2	End	55,110,252 bp

Gene location (Mouse)
Chr.	Chromosome 13 (mouse)
Band	13 D2.2|13 63.93 cM	Start	113,230,359 bp
Band	13 D2.2|13 63.93 cM	End	113,237,515 bp
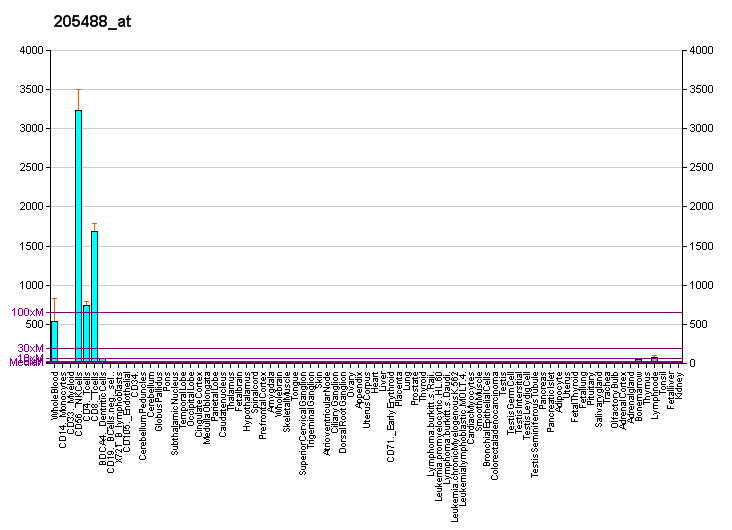
RNA expression pattern
Bgee	Human / Mouse (ortholog); Top expressed in: granulocyte; blood; spleen; jejunal mucosa; lymph node; mucosa of transverse colon; duodenum; testicle; palpebral conjunctiva; rectum / Top expressed in: gastrula; jejunum; thymus; duodenum; blood; right lung lobe; spleen; ankle joint; decidua; mesenteric lymph nodes; More reference expression data
BioGPS	More reference expression data
Gene ontology
Molecular function	peptidase activity; serine-type peptidase activity; serine-type endopeptidase activity; hydrolase activity; protein binding; protein homodimerization activity
Cellular component	immunological synapse; extracellular region; nucleus
Biological process	positive regulation of apoptotic process; negative regulation of DNA binding; proteolysis involved in cellular protein catabolic process; negative regulation of endodeoxyribonuclease activity; cytolysis; negative regulation of oxidoreductase activity; immune response; proteolysis; apoptotic process; response to bacterium
Sources:Amigo / QuickGO
Orthologs
Databases	NCBI: entry; OMA: entry
Species	Human	Mouse
Entrez	3001	14938
Ensembl	ENSG00000145649	ENSMUSG00000023132
UniProt	P12544	P11032
RefSeq (mRNA)	NM_006144	NM_010370
RefSeq (protein)	NP_006135	NP_034500
Location (UCSC)	Chr 5: 55.1 – 55.11 Mb	Chr 13: 113.23 – 113.24 Mb
PubMed search
- Wikidata
View/Edit Human	View/Edit Mouse

Granzyme A (GzmA, EC 3.4.21.78, CTLA3, HuTPS, T-cell associated protease 1, cytotoxic T lymphocyte serine protease, TSP-1, T-cell derived serine proteinase) is a tryptase and is one of the five granzymes encoded in the human genome. In humans, GzmA is encoded by the GZMA gene in proximity to the GZMK gene on chromosome 5. This enzyme is present in cytotoxic T lymphocyte (CTL) granules.

GzmA cleaves proteins after arginine or lysine basic residues. In CTL-targeted cells, it activates caspase-independent programmed cell death pathways that are unique and parallel to that of Granzyme B, although some substrates such as PARP-1 and lamin B are shared with Granzyme B. Substrates of GzmA include Pro-IL-1β, NDUFS3, SET, APE1, and Ku70 among others. In vitro studies suggest that GzmA may have less cytotoxic capabilities than GzmB.

In colorectal cancer, GzmA was associated with promotion of cancer development, which may be due to activation of inflammation-inducing cytokines from macrophages.

== See also ==
- GZMA
- GZMK
- GZMB
- GZMH
