= CTL-mediated cytotoxicity =

Within the scientific discipline of toxicology, Cytotoxic T lymphocytes (CTLs) are generated by immune activation of cytotoxic T cells (T_{c} cells). They are generally CD8^{+}, which makes them MHC class I restricted. CTLs are able to eliminate most cells in the body since most nucleated cells express class I MHC molecules. The CTL-mediated immune system can be divided into two phases. In the first phase, functional effector CTLs are generated from naive T_{c} cells through activation and differentiation. In the second phase, affector CTLs destroy target cells by recognizing the antigen-MHC class I complex.

== Phase 1 ==
In phase one, effector CTLs are generated from CTL precursors. The CTL precursors include naive T_{c} cells since they are incapable of killing target cells. After a precursor cell has been activated, it can then differentiate into a functional CTL with cytotoxic activity. There are three sequential signals that are required to complete this process.

First, there is TCR recognition of the peptide-MHC class I complex. This step allows the cell to become licensed to an antigen-presenting cell.

Second, a costimulatory signal is transmitted by the interaction between CD28 and B7 of the precursor cell and the licensed antigen-presenting cell.

Last, a signal is induced by the interaction between IL-2 and the high-affinity IL-2 receptor. This results in proliferation and differentiation of the antigen-activated precursor cell into a functional effector CTL.

== Phase 2 ==
In phase two, the now functional effector CTLs destroy the target cells. This can be done in two ways. These pathways are the cytotoxic protein pathway and the Fas ligand pathway. Apoptosis is the primary mechanism for both of these pathways.

=== Cytotoxic protein pathway ===
One pathway is the cytotoxic protein pathway. In this pathway perforins and granzymes are taken up by the target cell. In this pathway, the perforins facilitate the entry of granule contents into the cell. The granzymes then activate the endogenous apoptosis pathway, which induces cell death without necrosis. This leaves packages of fragmented DNA material from the target cell for the macrophages to dispose of.

=== Fas ligand pathway ===
The other pathway is the Fas ligand pathway. In this pathway, a Fas ligand (FasL) on the CTL binds to Fas receptor (FasR) on the target cell. This pathway is independent of granzymes. Instead it involves Interleukin-1β converting enzyme (ICE; also known as Caspase 1) activation, which is similar to granzyme B. This ultimately leads to DNA fragmentation.
