= Joseph Trapani =

Joseph Trapani may refer to:

- Joe Trapani, basketball player
- Joseph Trapani (immunologist)
