= Ajit Johnson =

Indian-born cancer geneticist

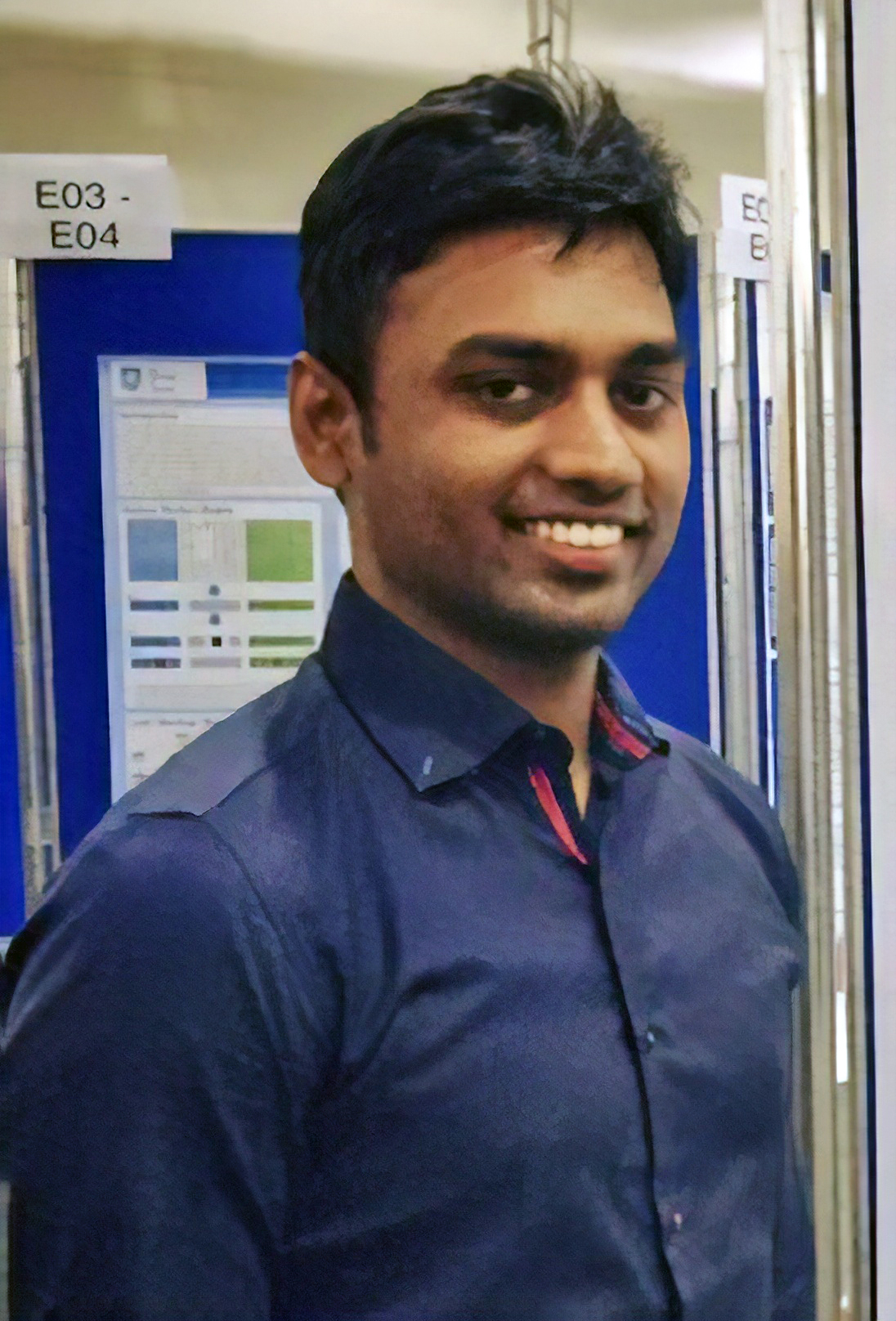
- Dr. Nirmal at the Intelligent Systems for Molecular Biology conference in 2015
- Born: Chennai, India
- Education: University College London; University of Edinburgh
- Known for: Computational Biology; Bioinformatics; Oncogenomics
- Scientific career
- Workplaces: Harvard University, Dana–Farber Cancer Institute
- Website: www.ajitjohnson.com

Ajit Johnson Nirmal is a cancer geneticist. He has also campaigned to raise awareness on tech addiction and net neutrality.

== Education ==
Born in Vellore, Johnson graduated with a bachelor's degree in biotechnology at Karunya University. Johnson graduated from University College London in 2011 and worked at the Indian Institute of Science. He earned a Doctor of Philosophy in cancer genetics and genomics from the University of Edinburgh and performed his post-doctoral work at Harvard Medical School and Dana Farber Cancer Institute.

== Career ==
=== Research ===
Johnson and colleagues developed a cell based gene therapy for haemophilia patients at the National Cancer Centre Singapore. Johnson developed ImSig, a network-based computational framework that facilitates the characterization of immune cells within the tumor microenvironment. Johnson's work involves multi-dimensional characterization (genetic, transcriptional, spatial and biophysical attributes) of the tumor ecosystem and understanding the differences in molecular signature of immune cells across tumours.
