= Eric Vivier =

Researcher

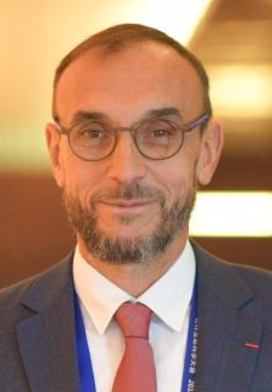
- Born: Clamart, France
- Scientific career
- Fields: Immunology

Eric Vivier is a French professor of immunology at Aix-Marseille and hospital practitioner at Marseille Public University Hospital. He is also Chief Scientific Officer at Innate Pharma, coordinator of the Marseille Immunopôle immunology cluster, and president of the Paris-Saclay Cancer Cluster. Vivier is a member of the expert panel of the European Research Council and serves on committees for several pharmaceutical and biotechnology companies.

== Early life and education ==
Eric Vivier was born in Clamart, France. Vivier is a Doctor of Veterinary Medicine (DVM). He graduated from the Ecole Nationale Vétérinaire de Maisons-Alfort and received his doctoral degree in immunology from Paris XI University. He completed postdoctoral training as a Fogarty International Center Research Fellow at Harvard Medical School with Paul J. Anderson and Stuart F. Schlossman at the Dana-Farber Cancer Institute.

== Career ==
Vivier joined Aix-Marseille University as a professor at the Centre d'Immunologie de Marseille-Luminy (CIML) in 1993, becoming its director in 2008 until 2017. He co-founded the biotech company Innate-Pharma in 1999 and in 2014, he co-founded the Marseille-Immunopole, an immunology cluster connecting basic research, therapeutic innovation, and industrial development in the Aix-Marseille region. Vivier was the chief scientific officer of Innate Pharma in January 2018 and in 2022, he served as president of the PSCC (Paris Saclay Cancer Cluster).

Vivier's research has focused on natural killer (NK) cells and innate lymphoid cells (ILCs). His work has contributed to the understanding of the development, function, and therapeutic potential of these cells. His early research investigated the mechanism of inhibitory MHC class I receptors on NK cells and the concept of ITIM-bearing molecules. His group identified the ITAM-bearing polypeptide, KARAP/DAP12/Tyrobp. This research led to the discovery and characterization of ILC3 cells in human and mouse intestines.

== Awards and honors ==
- French National League Against Cancer Award (1996, 2004, and 2013)
- National Award and Tremplins Rhône-Poulenc Award for Biotech start-ups (1999)
- Lucien Tartois Award from the Fondation pour la Recherche Médicale (1999)
- Jacques Oudin Award from the French Society for Immunology (2003)
- Deutsche Gesellschaft für Immunologie/EFIS Award (2004)
- Grand Prix Turpin in Oncology (2008)
- Grand Prix Charles Oberling in Oncology (2010)
- Australasian Society for Immunology, Visiting Speaker Programme Award (2015)
- Thomson Reuters Highly Cited Researcher (2015, 2016, 2017)

Vivier became a senior fellow of the Institut Universitaire de France in 2007 and was elected to the French National Academy of Medicine in 2013. In 2016, he was awarded honorary citizen of Cassis, Chevalier de la Légion d’Honneur and Ambassadeur de la ville de Marseille.
