= GPR75 =

Protein-coding gene in humans

Identifiers
- Aliases: GPR75, GPRchr2, WI31133, G protein-coupled receptor 75
- External IDs: OMIM: 606704; MGI: 2441843; GeneCards: GPR75

Gene location (Human)
Chr.	Chromosome 2 (human)
Band	2p16.2	Start	53,852,912 bp
Band	2p16.2	End	53,859,967 bp

Gene location (Mouse)
Chr.	Chromosome 11 (mouse)
Band	11|11 A4	Start	30,835,358 bp
Band	11|11 A4	End	30,843,729 bp
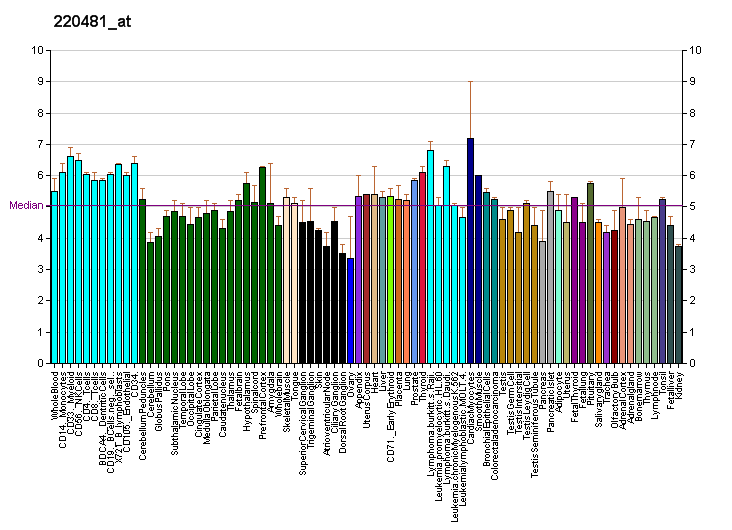
RNA expression pattern
Bgee	Human / Mouse (ortholog); Top expressed in: testicle; ventricular zone; islet of Langerhans; prefrontal cortex; internal globus pallidus; caudate nucleus; nucleus accumbens; amygdala; putamen; cingulate gyrus / Top expressed in: lumbar spinal ganglion; visual cortex; cerebellar cortex; primary visual cortex; dentate gyrus of hippocampal formation granule cell; superior frontal gyrus; embryo; neural layer of retina; embryo; cerebellar vermis; More reference expression data
BioGPS	More reference expression data
Gene ontology
Molecular function	C-C chemokine receptor activity; signal transducer activity; G protein-coupled receptor activity
Cellular component	integral component of membrane; plasma membrane; integral component of plasma membrane; membrane
Biological process	chemokine-mediated signaling pathway; regulation of neuron death; signal transduction; G protein-coupled receptor signaling pathway
Sources:Amigo / QuickGO
Orthologs
Databases	NCBI: entry; OMA: entry
Species	Human	Mouse
Entrez	10936	237716
Ensembl	ENSG00000119737	ENSMUSG00000043999
UniProt	O95800	Q6X632
RefSeq (mRNA)	NM_006794	NM_175490
RefSeq (protein)	NP_006785	NP_780699
Location (UCSC)	Chr 2: 53.85 – 53.86 Mb	Chr 11: 30.84 – 30.84 Mb
PubMed search
- Wikidata
View/Edit Human	View/Edit Mouse

Probable G-protein coupled receptor 75 is a protein that in humans is encoded by the GPR75 gene.

== Function ==
GPR75 is a member of the G protein-coupled receptor family. GPRs are cell surface receptors that activate guanine-nucleotide binding proteins upon the binding of a ligand.

GPR75 is currently classified as an orphan GPCR and several studies are underway to identify its ligand. In one study, the chemokine CCL5 (RANTES) has been shown to stimulate calcium mobilization and inositol triphosphate formation in GPR75-transfected cells.

A 2021 study by Akbari & Gilani et al. reported that people with protein-truncating variants of GPR75 were associated with 5.3kg lower body weight and 54% lower odds for obesity. GPR75 knock-out mice showed resistance to weight gain under high-fat diet.
