= Joseph Trapani (immunologist) =

Australian immunologist

Joseph Trapani AO FAA FAHMS

Personal details
- Born: Joseph Albert Trapani
- Occupation: Immunologist

Joseph Albert Trapani is an Australian immunologist.

Trapani studied at the University of Melbourne and did his PhD in the immunogenetics of B27-related arthropathy. He later discovered that the protein perforin forms pores in the target cell and provides access for granzymes to enter and trigger cell death by apoptosis. Since 1995, Trapania has worked on developing CAR T therapy for treating cancer.

Trapani became an Officer of the Order of Australia in the 2024 Australia Day Honours for "distinguished service to medical research, particularly immunology and the development of immune-based cancer therapies, and to the community."
