= GZMB =

Protein-coding gene in humans

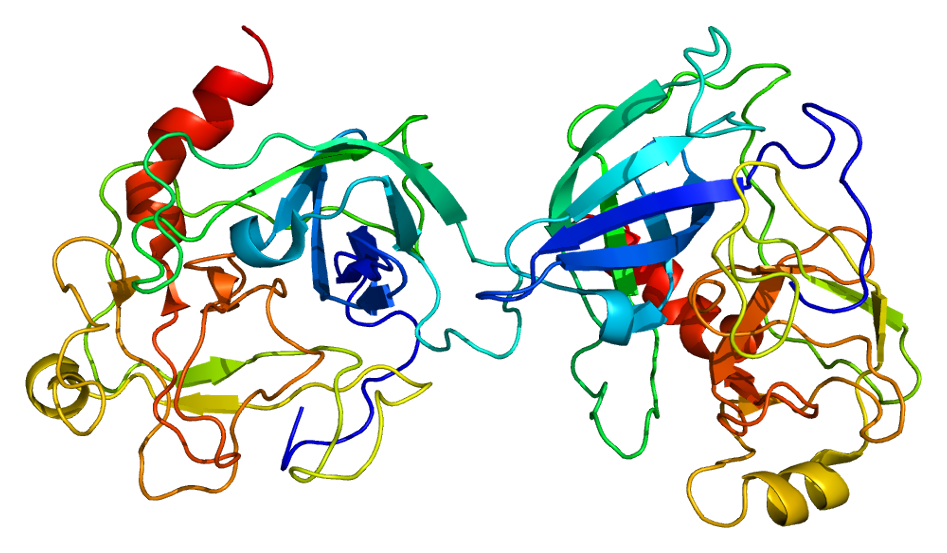

Identifiers
- Aliases: GZMB, CCPI, CGL-1, CGL1, CSP-B, CSPB, CTLA1, CTSGL1, HLP, SECT, granzyme B, C11
- External IDs: OMIM: 123910; MGI: 109267; GeneCards: GZMB
Available structures
| PDB | Ortholog search: PDBe RCSB |
| PDB | List of PDB id codes 1FQ3, 1IAU |
Enzyme activity
| EC # | BRENDA | ExPASy | KEGG | MetaCyc |
|---|---|---|---|---|
| 3.4.21.79 | ↗ | ↗ | ↗ | ↗ |

Gene location (Human)
| Chr. | Chromosome 14 (human) |
| Band | 14q12 | Start | 24,630,954 bp |
| Band | 14q12 | End | 24,634,267 bp |

Gene location (Mouse)
| Chr. | Chromosome 14 (mouse) |
| Band | 14 C3|14 28.19 cM | Start | 56,496,295 bp |
| Band | 14 C3|14 28.19 cM | End | 56,499,717 bp |
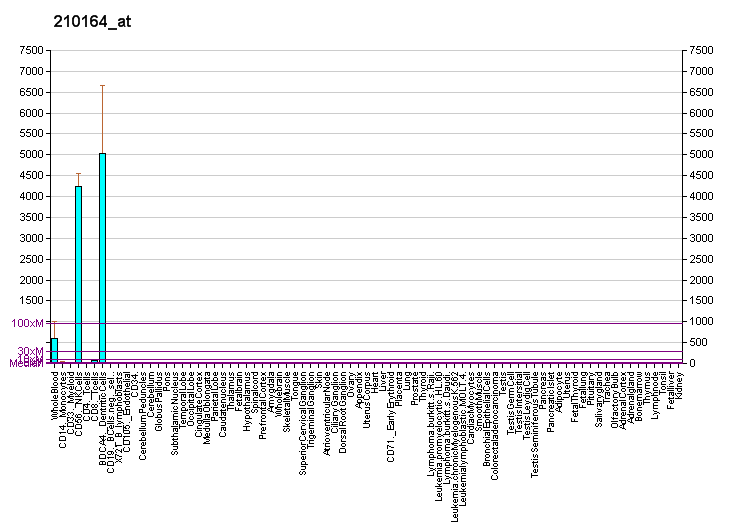
RNA expression pattern
| Bgee | Human / Mouse (ortholog); Top expressed in: granulocyte; blood; mononuclear cell; monocyte; spleen; bone marrow; decidua; lymph node; right lung; appendix / Top expressed in: gastrula; jejunum; duodenum; decidua; blood; intestinal villus; embryo; pharynx; uterus; seminal vesicula; More reference expression data |
| BioGPS | More reference expression data |
Gene ontology
| Molecular function | peptidase activity; protein binding; serine-type peptidase activity; serine-type endopeptidase activity; hydrolase activity |
| Cellular component | cytosol; membrane; immunological synapse; nucleus; mitochondrion; secretory granule; cytoplasm |
| Biological process | cytolysis; proteolysis; positive regulation of protein insertion into mitochondrial membrane involved in apoptotic signaling pathway; natural killer cell mediated cytotoxicity; apoptotic process; granzyme-mediated apoptotic signaling pathway |
Sources:Amigo / QuickGO
Orthologs
| Databases | NCBI: entry; OMA: entry |
| Species | Human | Mouse |
| Entrez | 3002 | 14939 |
| Ensembl | ENSG00000100453 | ENSMUSG00000015437 |
| UniProt | P10144 | P04187 |
| RefSeq (mRNA) | NM_004131; NM_001346011 | NM_013542 |
| RefSeq (protein) | NP_001332940; NP_004122 | NP_038570 |
| Location (UCSC) | Chr 14: 24.63 – 24.63 Mb | Chr 14: 56.5 – 56.5 Mb |
| PubMed search |
- Wikidata
| View/Edit Human | View/Edit Mouse |

GZMB is a gene that in humans encodes the enzyme Granzyme B, a serine protease expressed by cytotoxic T lymphocytes (CTL) and natural killer (NK) cells.

CTL and NK cells share the remarkable ability to recognize specific infected target cells. They are thought to protect their host by inducing apoptosis of cells that bear on their surface 'nonself' antigens, usually peptides or proteins resulting from infection by intracellular pathogens. The protein encoded by this gene is crucial for the rapid induction of target cell apoptosis by CTL in cell-mediated immune response.

== See also ==
- The Proteolysis Map
- Granzyme
