= GZMM =

Protein-coding gene in the species Homo sapiens

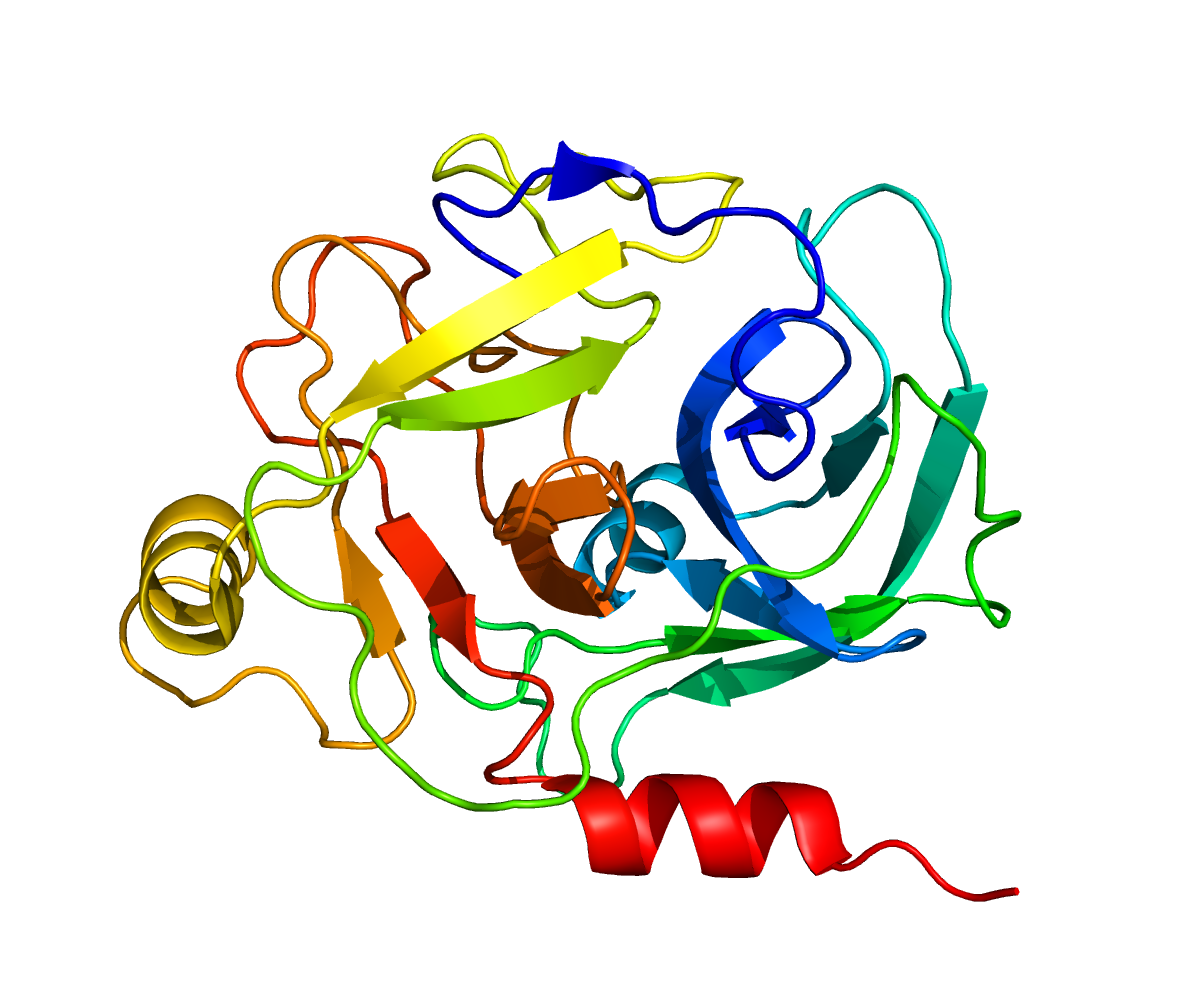

Identifiers
- Aliases: GZMM, LMET1, MET1, granzyme M
- External IDs: OMIM: 600311; MGI: 99549; GeneCards: GZMM
Available structures
PDB	Human UniProt search: PDBe RCSB
PDB	List of PDB id codes 2ZGC, 2ZGH, 2ZGJ, 2ZKS

Gene location (Human)
Chr.	Chromosome 19 (human)
Band	19p13.3	Start	544,034 bp
Band	19p13.3	End	549,924 bp

Gene location (Mouse)
Chr.	Chromosome 10 (mouse)
Band	10 C1|10 39.72 cM	Start	79,524,854 bp
Band	10 C1|10 39.72 cM	End	79,531,095 bp
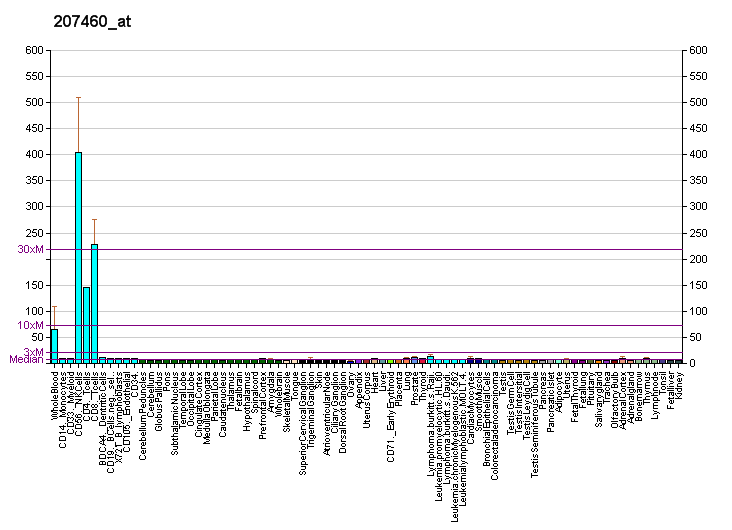
RNA expression pattern
Bgee	Human / Mouse (ortholog); Top expressed in: granulocyte; blood; spleen; lymph node; appendix; mucosa of transverse colon; thymus; cerebellar hemisphere; right hemisphere of cerebellum; bone marrow / Top expressed in: neural layer of retina; muscle of thigh; morula; retinal pigment epithelium; interventricular septum; olfactory epithelium; embryo; embryo; granulocyte; blastocyst; More reference expression data
BioGPS	More reference expression data
Gene ontology
Molecular function	peptidase activity; serine-type peptidase activity; endopeptidase activity; serine-type endopeptidase activity; hydrolase activity; protein binding
Cellular component	extracellular region; membrane
Biological process	innate immune response; cell death; cytolysis; proteolysis; immune system process; apoptotic process; T cell mediated cytotoxicity
Sources:Amigo / QuickGO
Orthologs
Databases	NCBI: entry; OMA: entry
Species	Human	Mouse
Entrez	3004	16904
Ensembl	ENSG00000197540	ENSMUSG00000054206
UniProt	P51124	n/a
RefSeq (mRNA)	NM_005317; NM_001258351	NM_008504; NM_001302485; NM_001302499
RefSeq (protein)	NP_001245280; NP_005308	n/a
Location (UCSC)	Chr 19: 0.54 – 0.55 Mb	Chr 10: 79.52 – 79.53 Mb
PubMed search
- Wikidata
View/Edit Human	View/Edit Mouse

Granzyme M is a protein that in humans is encoded by the GZMM gene.

Human natural killer (NK) cells and activated lymphocytes express and store a distinct subset of neutral serine proteases together with proteoglycans and other immune effector molecules in large cytoplasmic granules. These serine proteases are collectively termed granzymes and include 4 distinct gene products: granzyme A, granzyme B, granzyme H, and Met-ase, also known as granzyme M.
