= Granzyme =

Class of proteins

Granzymes are serine proteases released by cytoplasmic granules within cytotoxic T cells and natural killer (NK) cells. They induce programmed cell death (apoptosis) in the target cell, thus eliminating cells that have become cancerous or are infected with viruses or bacteria. Granzymes also kill bacteria and inhibit viral replication. In NK cells and T cells, granzymes are packaged in cytotoxic granules along with perforin. Granzymes can also be detected in the rough endoplasmic reticulum, golgi complex, and the trans-golgi reticulum. The contents of the cytotoxic granules function to permit entry of the granzymes into the target cell cytosol. The granules are released into an immune synapse formed with a target cell, where perforin mediates the delivery of the granzymes into endosomes in the target cell, and finally into the target cell cytosol. Granzymes are part of the serine esterase family. They are closely related to other immune serine proteases expressed by innate immune cells, such as neutrophil elastase and cathepsin G.

Granzyme B activates apoptosis by activating caspases (especially caspase-3), which cleaves many substrates, including caspase-activated DNase to execute cell death. Granzyme B also cleaves the protein Bid, which recruits the proteins Bax and Bak to change the membrane permeability of the mitochondria, causing the release of cytochrome c (which is one of the parts needed to activate caspase-9 via the apoptosome), Smac/Diablo and Omi/HtrA2 (which suppress the inhibitor of apoptosis proteins (IAPs)), among other proteins. Granzyme B also cleaves many of the proteins responsible for apoptosis in the absence of caspase activity. The other granzymes activate cell death by caspase-dependent and caspase-independent mechanisms.

In addition to killing their target cells, granzymes can target and kill intracellular pathogens. Granzymes A and B induce lethal oxidative damage in bacteria by cleaving components of the electron transport chain, while granzyme B cleaves viral proteins to inhibit viral activation and replication. The granzymes bind directly to the nucleic acids DNA and RNA; this enhances their cleavage of nucleic acid binding proteins.

More recently, in addition to T lymphocytes, granzymes have been shown to be expressed in other types of immune cells such as dendritic cells, B cells and mast cells. In addition, granzymes may also be expressed in non-immune cells such as keratinocytes, pneumocytes and chondrocytes. As many of these cell types either do not express perforin or do not form immunological synapses, granzyme B is released extracellularly. Extracellular granzyme B can accumulate in the extracellular space in diseases associated with dysregulated or chronic inflammation leading to the degradation of extracellular matrix proteins and impaired tissue healing and remodelling. Extracellular granzyme B has been implicated in the pathogenesis of atherosclerosis, aneurysm, vascular leakage, chronic wound healing, and skin aging.

== History ==
In 1986 Jürg Tschopp and his group published a paper on their discovery of granzymes. In the paper they discussed how they purified, characterized and discovered a variety of granzymes found within cytolytic granules that were carried by cytotoxic T lymphocytes and natural killer cells. Jürg was able to identify 8 different granzymes and discovered partial amino acid sequences for each. The molecules were unofficially named Grs for five years before Jürg and his team came up with the name granzymes which was widely accepted by the scientific community.

Granzyme secretion can be detected and measured using Western Blot or ELISA techniques. Granzyme secreting cells can be identified and quantified by flow cytometry or ELISPOT. Alternatively, granzyme activity can be assayed by virtue of their protease activity.

== Other functions ==
In Cullen's paper "Granzymes in Cancer and Immunity" he discusses how granzyme A has been known to be found in elevated levels within patients who currently have an infectious disease and/or in a pro-inflammatory state. Granzymes have also been found to help initiate the inflammatory response. "For example, rheumatoid arthritis patients have increased levels of granzyme A in the synovial fluid of swollen joints". When granzymes are in an extracellular state they have the ability to activate macrophages and mast cells to initiate the inflammatory response. The interaction between the granzymes and somatic cells are still unexplainable but advances in understanding the process are being made constantly. Other granzymes like granzyme K have been found in high levels of patients who have gone septic. Granzyme H has been found to have a direct correlation with patients who have a viral infection. Scientists are able to conclude that granzyme H specializes in detecting 'proteolytic degradation' which is found in viral proteins.

Cullen further states in his paper that granzymes may have a role in immunomodulation, or the job of maintaining homeostasis in the immune system during an infection. "In humans, loss of perforin function leads to a syndrome called familial hemophagocytic lymphohistiocytosis […]". This syndrome can lead to death because both T cells and macrophages multiply to fight the pathogen, resulting in harmful levels of proinflammatory cytokines. The overactivation can lead to inflammation of vital organs, anemia via overactivated macrophages phagocytosing blood cells, and can potentially be fatal.

In Trapani's paper he talks about how granzymes may have other functions, in addition to their ability to fight off infection. Granzyme A contains certain chemicals that allow it to cause proliferation in B cells to reduce the chance of cancer growth and formation. Test on mice have shown that granzyme A and B might not have a direct link to controlling viral infections, but helping accelerate the immune systems response.

== In cancer research ==
In Cullen's paper "Granzymes in Cancer and Immunity" he describes the process of "immune surveillance [as] the process whereby precancerous and malignant cells are recognized by the immune system as damaged and are consequently targeted for elimination". For a tumor to progress it requires conditions within the body and surrounding area to be growth-promoting. Almost all people have suitable immune cells to fight off tumors in the body. Studies have shown that the immune system even has the ability to prevent precancerous cells from growing and arbitrate the regression of established tumors. The dangerous thing about cancer cells is they have the ability to inhibit the function of the immune system. Although a tumor may be in its beginning stage and very weak, it may be giving off chemicals that inhibit the function of the immune system allowing it to grow and become harmful. Tests have shown that mice without granzymes and perforins are at high risk to have tumors spread throughout their body.

Tumors have the ability to escape from immune surveillance by secreting immunosuppressive TGF-β. This inhibits proliferation and activation of T cells. TGF-β production is the most potent mechanism of immune avoidance used by tumors. TGF-β inhibits expression of five different cytotoxic genes including perforin, granzyme A, and granzyme B, which then inhibits T cell-mediated tumor clearance.

Perforin's role in protecting the body against lymphoma was emphasized when scientists discovered that p53 did not have as big of a role in lymphoma surveillance as its counterpart perforin. Perforin and granzymes have been found to have a directly related ability to protect the body against the formation of different kinds of lymphomas.

== Genes ==
- GZMA
- GZMB
- GZMH
- GZMK
- GZMM
