= GZMH =

Protein-coding gene in the species Homo sapiens

Identifiers
- Aliases: GZMH, CCP-X, CGL-2, CSP-C, CTLA1, CTSGL2, granzyme H
- External IDs: OMIM: 116831; MGI: 109254; GeneCards: GZMH
Available structures
| PDB | Ortholog search: PDBe RCSB |
| PDB | List of PDB id codes 3TJU, 3TJV, 3TK9, 4GAW |

Gene location (Human)
| Chr. | Chromosome 14 (human) |
| Band | 14q12 | Start | 24,606,480 bp |
| Band | 14q12 | End | 24,609,699 bp |

Gene location (Mouse)
| Chr. | Chromosome 14 (mouse) |
| Band | 14 C3|14 28.19 cM | Start | 56,442,720 bp |
| Band | 14 C3|14 28.19 cM | End | 56,448,874 bp |
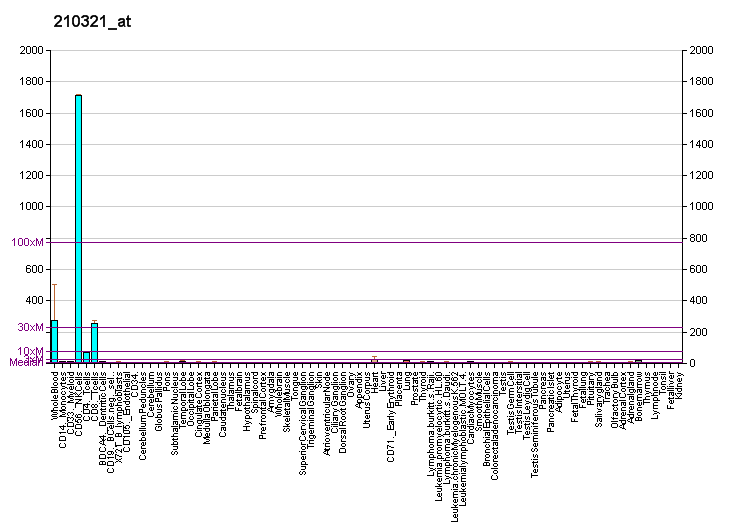
RNA expression pattern
| Bgee | Human / Mouse (ortholog); Top expressed in: granulocyte; blood; spleen; bone marrow cell; periodontal fiber; decidua; gallbladder; lymph node; right lung; palpebral conjunctiva / Top expressed in: gastrula; decidua; ankle joint; central gray substance of midbrain; nucleus of stria terminalis; uterus; yolk sac; tail of embryo; adipose tissue; dentate gyrus; More reference expression data |
| BioGPS | More reference expression data |
Gene ontology
| Molecular function | peptidase activity; serine-type peptidase activity; serine-type endopeptidase activity; hydrolase activity |
| Cellular component | membrane; secretory granule; cytoplasm |
| Biological process | cytolysis; apoptotic process; proteolysis; granzyme-mediated apoptotic signaling pathway |
Sources:Amigo / QuickGO
Orthologs
| Databases | NCBI: entry; OMA: entry |
| Species | Human | Mouse |
| Entrez | 2999 | 14943 |
| Ensembl | ENSG00000100450 | ENSMUSG00000015441 |
| UniProt | P20718 | P08883 |
| RefSeq (mRNA) | NM_001270780; NM_001270781; NM_033423 | NM_010374 |
| RefSeq (protein) | NP_001257709; NP_001257710; NP_219491 | NP_034504 |
| Location (UCSC) | Chr 14: 24.61 – 24.61 Mb | Chr 14: 56.44 – 56.45 Mb |
| PubMed search |
- Wikidata
| View/Edit Human | View/Edit Mouse |

Granzyme H is a protein that in humans is encoded by the GZMH gene.
