= Perforin-1 =

Mammalian protein found in Homo sapiens

PRF1
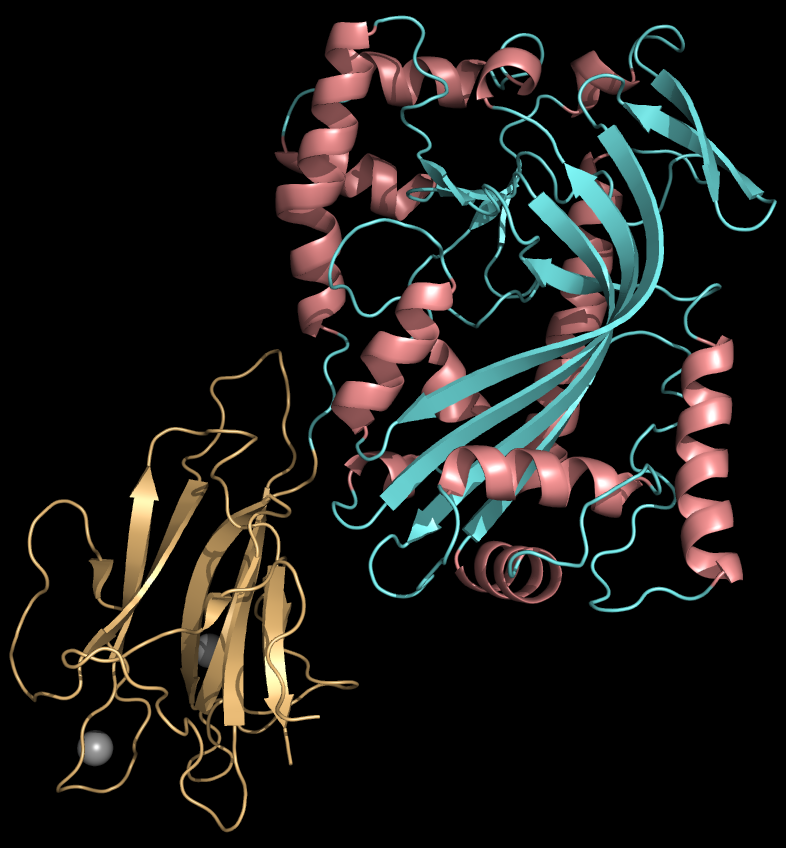

Identifiers
- Aliases: PRF1, FLH2, HPLH2, P1, PFN1, PFP, perforin 1
- External IDs: OMIM: 170280; MGI: 97551; GeneCards: PRF1

Gene location (Human)
Chr.	Chromosome 10 (human)
Band	10q22.1	Start	70,597,348 bp
Band	10q22.1	End	70,602,759 bp

Gene location (Mouse)
Chr.	Chromosome 10 (mouse)
Band	10 B4|10 32.18 cM	Start	61,133,612 bp
Band	10 B4|10 32.18 cM	End	61,140,459 bp
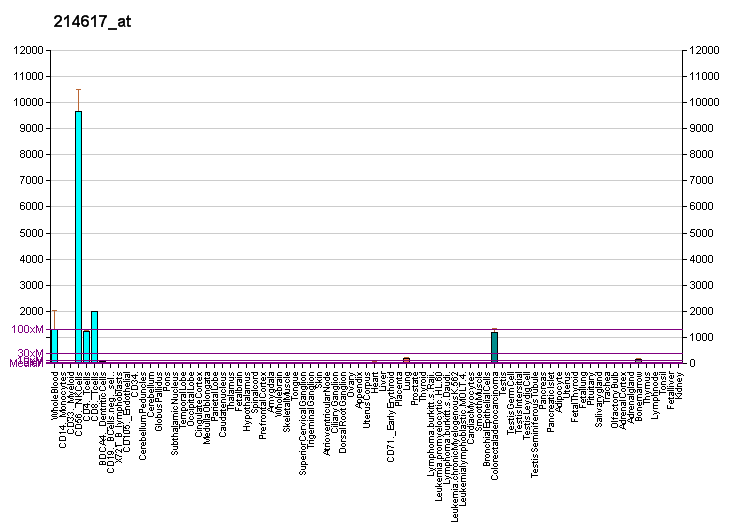
RNA expression pattern
Bgee	Human / Mouse (ortholog); Top expressed in: granulocyte; blood; spleen; decidua; bone marrow cell; buccal mucosa cell; apex of heart; lymph node; superficial temporal artery; upper lobe of left lung / Top expressed in: gastrula; decidua; blood; lumbar subsegment of spinal cord; embryo; spleen; lymph node; subcutaneous adipose tissue; thymus; right lung; More reference expression data
BioGPS	More reference expression data
Gene ontology
Molecular function	protein binding; metal ion binding; calcium ion binding; wide pore channel activity; identical protein binding
Cellular component	integral component of membrane; extracellular region; endosome; plasma membrane; endosome lumen; membrane; cytosol; cytoplasmic vesicle; cytolytic granule
Biological process	cellular defense response; immunological synapse formation; cytolysis; apoptotic process; transmembrane transport; positive regulation of killing of cells of other organism; defense response to tumor cell; immune response to tumor cell; protein homooligomerization; defense response to virus; T cell mediated cytotoxicity
Sources:Amigo / QuickGO
Orthologs
Databases	NCBI: entry; OMA: entry
Species	Human	Mouse
Entrez	5551	18646
Ensembl	ENSG00000180644	ENSMUSG00000037202
UniProt	P14222	P10820
RefSeq (mRNA)	NM_005041; NM_001083116	NM_011073
RefSeq (protein)	NP_001076585; NP_005032	NP_035203
Location (UCSC)	Chr 10: 70.6 – 70.6 Mb	Chr 10: 61.13 – 61.14 Mb
PubMed search
- Wikidata
View/Edit Human	View/Edit Mouse

Perforin-1, encoded by the PRF1 gene, is a pore-forming toxic protein housed in the secretory granules of cytotoxic T lymphocytes (CTLs) and natural killer (NK) cells. Together, these cells are known as cytotoxic lymphocytes (CLs).

== Discovery ==
Perforin was initially discovered in 1983 and subsequently cloned from an expression library in 1988 using anti-complement C9 antibody cross-reactivity. A sequence comparison showed a notable resemblance between the two proteins in a specific central region, termed the 'membrane attack complex/perforin' (MACPF) domain.

== Structure and function ==
Purifying perforin is challenging due to its tendency to lose activity and stability in solution, and only recently has a recombinant form been successfully produced.

Perforin is a pore forming cytolytic protein found in the granules of cytotoxic T lymphocytes (CTLs) and natural killer cells (NK cells). Upon degranulation, perforin molecules translocate to the target cell with the help of calreticulin, which works as a chaperone protein to prevent perforin from degrading. Perforin then binds to the target cell's plasma membrane via membrane phospholipids while phosphatidylcholine binds calcium ions to increase perforin's affinity to the membrane. Perforin oligomerises in a Ca2+ dependent manner to form pores on the target cell. The pore formed allows for the passive diffusion of a family of pro-apoptotic proteases, known as the granzymes, into the target cell. The lytic membrane-inserting part of perforin is the MACPF domain. This region shares homology with cholesterol-dependent cytolysins from Gram-positive bacteria.

The initial concept of a plasma membrane pore model was challenged when research revealed that granzyme B could undergo endocytosis independently of perforin. Moreover, experiments demonstrated that apoptosis could be induced by adding perforin to washed cells that had already endocytosed granzyme B, even in the absence of perforin during the endocytosis process. In light of these findings, Froelich and colleagues suggested that perforin's action might not occur at the plasma membrane as previously thought, but rather at the endosomal membrane. They proposed that perforin likely facilitates the release of granzymes from endosomes by forming pores in the endosomal membrane.

Perforin has structural and functional similarities to complement component 9 (C9). Like C9, this protein creates transmembrane tubules and is capable of lysing non-specifically a variety of target cells. This protein is one of the main cytolytic proteins of cytolytic granules, and it is known to be a key effector molecule for T-cell- and natural killer-cell-mediated cytolysis. Perforin is thought to act by creating holes in the plasma membrane which triggers an influx of calcium and initiates membrane repair mechanisms. These repair mechanisms bring perforin and granzymes into early endosomes.

== Clinical significance ==
=== Acute presentations of perforinopathy — FHL ===
Around the turn of the 21st century, it was recognized that a total loss of perforin activity leads to a severe, fatal autosomal recessive immunoregulatory disorder in infants, known as familial hemophagocytic lymphohistiocytosis (FHL), typically appearing before 12 months of age. This condition can only be treated effectively with a bone marrow transplant from a non-related donor.

The pathogenesis involves a sequence of downstream events resulting from the inability of NK cells and CTLs to present functional perforin, thereby failing to kill target cells. Infants affected by this condition typically show symptoms of "classic" familial hemophagocytic lymphohistiocytosis (FHL) and meet most or all of the criteria outlined in HLH-2004. Diagnosis is confirmed by reduced NK cell cytotoxicity, as healthy NK cells normally exhibit constitutive, pathogen-independent cytotoxicity, and by identifying mutations in genes such as PRF1, UNC13D, STX11, and STXBP2.

=== Sub-acute presentations of perforinopathy ===
Sub-acute perforinopathies encompass a diverse array of symptoms, all stemming from a partial ("sub-total") reduction in cytotoxic lymphocyte (CL) activity due to bi-allelic mutations in one of the four previously mentioned genes. In contrast to the acute form, diagnosing sub-acute perforinopathies can be challenging due to their typically milder and more sporadic clinical manifestations, an intermittent disease course, variability in onset age, and their frequent positive response to non-specific immune-suppressive or immune-ablative treatments.

=== Chronic presentations of perforinopathy ===
Chronic perforinopathies are regarded as a range of immune-related conditions resulting from monoallelic mutations in genes linked to familial hemophagocytic lymphohistiocytosis (FHL). These conditions typically manifest differently from classic FHL and may include conditions like blood cancers and macrophage activation syndrome, particularly in patients with juvenile rheumatoid arthritis. Onset of symptoms usually occurs after the age of 5. Moreover, some research suggests a correlation between variations in the PRF1 gene and the outcome of allogeneic bone marrow transplantation. However, these associations remain controversial, with studies disproving the connection outweighing those supporting it.

== Interactions ==
Perforin has been shown to interact with calreticulin.

== See also ==
- Granzymes
- Defensin
- Complement membrane attack complex
