= Ash Alizadeh =

Iranian-American physician-scientist

Ash A. Alizadeh
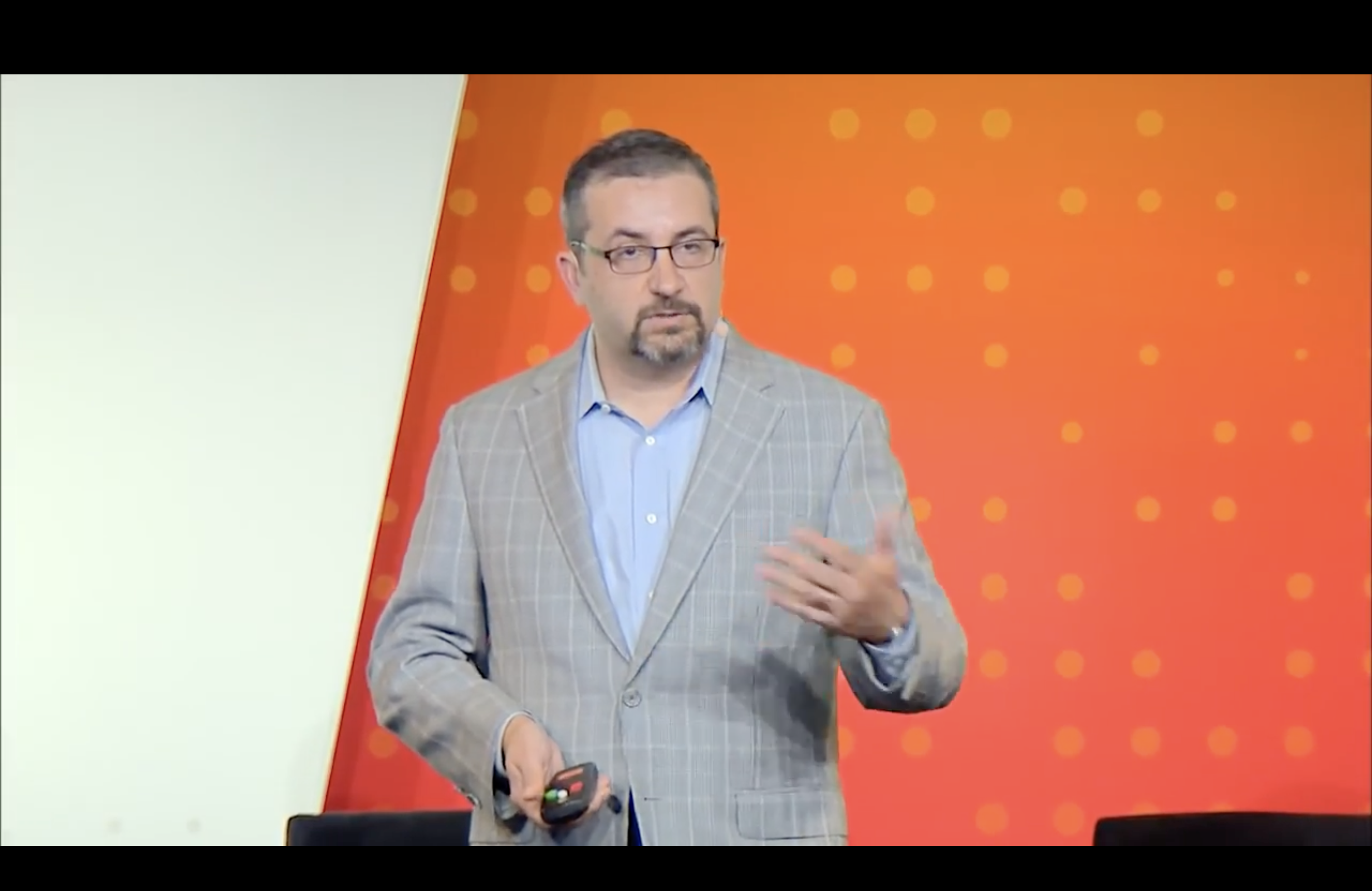
- Born: Arash Alizadeh
- Citizenship: Iranian-American
- Education: University of California, Los Angeles (B.S.); Stanford University (M.D., Ph.D.)
- Known for: Lymphochip microarray; molecular subtypes of DLBCL; CAPP-Seq; CIBERSORT
- Scientific career
- Fields: Oncology, Cancer genomics, Liquid biopsy, Computational biology
- Workplaces: Stanford University School of Medicine
- Thesis: Genome-scale expression programs in normal and malignant immune cells (2001)
- Doctoral advisor: Patrick O. Brown; Louis M. Staudt
- Website: med.stanford.edu/ash_alizadeh.html

Ash A. Alizadeh (born Arash Alizadeh) is an Iranian-American physician-scientist and professor of medicine at Stanford University School of Medicine in the Division of Oncology. His research focuses on cancer genomic technologies and development of liquid biopsy methods such as CAPP-Seq, as well as the genomic and immunologic mechanisms driving lymphoid malignancies, and computational approaches for characterizing tumor microenvironments. Alizadeh is recognized for developing the Lymphochip microarray and for his early cancer molecular taxonomy work defining the molecular subtypes of diffuse large B-cell lymphoma (DLBCL), which transformed lymphoma classification and clinical management.

According to Google Scholar, he has 96,975 citations, an h-index of 103, and an i10-index of 213.

== Education and training ==
Alizadeh earned his Bachelor of Science in Biochemistry with honors from the University of California, Los Angeles in 1994. He completed the NIH-funded Medical Scientist Training Program (MSTP) at Stanford University School of Medicine, receiving his M.D. in 2003 and Ph.D. in Biophysics in 2001.

He completed his residency in internal medicine through the Clinical Investigator Pathway at Stanford Hospital (2004–2006), followed by a fellowship in hematology and oncology (2006–2009) under Sandra Horning. From 2007 to 2010, he held a postdoctoral fellowship at Stanford in investigative hematology with Irving Weissman and Ronald Levy.

== Academic career ==
Alizadeh joined the Stanford University faculty in 2009 as an Assistant Professor and became a full professor in 2021. He is the Moghadam Family Professor of Medicine (Oncology) in the Stanford Cancer Institute and directs the Alizadeh Laboratory at Stanford. His group studies tumor heterogeneity, immune–tumor interactions, and circulating tumor DNA (ctDNA) dynamics in lymphoma and solid cancers.

Alizadeh is a co-founder of CAPP Medical, a cancer diagnostics company that was later acquired by Roche, as well as CiberMed. He has also contributed to the founding of Foresight Diagnostics, which was subsequently acquired by Natera, and Resero Bio. His U.S. patents include “Systems and methods for analyzing mixed cell populations” (US 12,249,401, issued 11 March 2025), “Methods and systems for analyzing nucleic acid molecules” (US 11,965,215, issued 23 April 2024), and “Identification and use of circulating nucleic acid tumor markers” (US 12,421,559, issued 23 September 2025), along with additional patents such as US 12,571,054 and US 12,562,239, and multiple pending applications on related technologies.

== Research and contributions ==
Alizadeh's early work with Patrick Brown and Louis Staudt led to the development of the Lymphochip cDNA microarray, which enabled genome-scale profiling of lymphoid malignancies. Using this tool, Alizadeh and collaborators demonstrated that diffuse large B-cell lymphoma (DLBCL) comprises distinct molecular subtypes with different clinical outcomes, published in Nature in 2000. This study reshaped lymphoma classification by incorporating gene expression profiling.

At Stanford, Alizadeh's laboratory developed CIBERSORT and CIBERSORTx for immune cell deconvolution, and PhasED-Seq, EPIC-Seq, and CAPP-Seq for ultrasensitive detection of circulating tumor DNA.

Alizadeh has authored or co-authored more than 140 peer-reviewed papers in journals such as Nature, Nature Medicine, Cell, Cancer Cell, Journal of Clinical Oncology, New England Journal of Medicine, JAMA, and others.

== Honors and awards ==
- Howard Hughes Medical Institute–NIH Research Scholar Award (1996–1998)
- Leukemia & Lymphoma Society Special Fellow in Clinical Research (2010–2013)
- Doris Duke Clinical Scientist Development Award (2011–2014)
- Damon Runyon Cancer Research Foundation Clinical Investigator Award (2014–2017)
- V Foundation Scholar Award and Martin Abeloff Award (2014–2016)
- American Society of Hematology Scholar Award (2015–2017)
- American Red Cross Blood Services Hero (2016)
- Election to the American Society for Clinical Investigation (2017)
- Leukemia & Lymphoma Society Scholar Award (2019–2024)
- Moghadam Family Professorship of Medicine, Stanford University (2021–present)

== Selected publications ==
- Alizadeh, AA; Eisen, MB; Davis, RE; et al. (2000). "Distinct types of diffuse large B-cell lymphoma identified by gene expression profiling". Nature. 403: 503–511. doi:10.1038/35000501. PMID 10676951.
- Lossos, IS; Czerwinski, DK; Alizadeh, AA; et al. (2004). "Prediction of survival in diffuse large B-cell lymphoma based on the expression of six genes". New England Journal of Medicine. 350: 1828–1837. doi:10.1056/NEJMoa032520. PMID 15115829.
- Alig, SK; et al. (2024). "Distinct Hodgkin lymphoma subtypes defined by noninvasive genomic profiling". Nature. 625 (7996): 778–787. doi:10.1038/s41586-023-06903-x. PMID 38168052.
- Gentles, AJ; Newman, AM; Liu, CL; Alizadeh, AA; et al. (2015). "The prognostic landscape of genes and infiltrating immune cells across human cancers". Nature Medicine. 21: 938–945. doi:10.1038/nm.3909. PMID 26193342.
- Newman, AM; Liu, CL; Diehn, M; Alizadeh, AA; et al. (2015). "Robust enumeration of cell subsets from tissue expression profiles". Nature Methods. 12: 453–457. doi:10.1038/nmeth.3337. PMID 25822800.
- Kurtz, DM; et al. (2018). "Circulating Tumor DNA Measurements As Early Outcome Predictors in Diffuse Large B-Cell Lymphoma". Journal of Clinical Oncology. 36: 2845–2853. doi:10.1200/JCO.2018.78.5246. PMID 30125215.
- Newman, AM; et al. (2016). "Integrated digital error suppression for improved detection of circulating tumor DNA". Nature Biotechnology. 34 (5): 547–555. doi:10.1038/nbt.3520. PMID 27018799.
- Kurtz, DM; Soo, J; Co Ting Keh, L; Alig, S; et al. (2021). "Enhanced detection of minimal residual disease by targeted sequencing of phased variants in circulating tumor DNA". Nature Biotechnology. 39: 1537–1547. doi:10.1038/s41587-021-00981-w. PMID 34385711.
- Esfahani, MS; Hamilton, EG; Mehrmohamadi, M; Nabet, BY; Alig, SK; et al. (2022). "Inferring gene expression from cell-free DNA fragmentation profiles". Nature Biotechnology. 40: 585–597. doi:10.1038/s41587-022-01222-4.
- Kurtz, DM; Esfahani, MS; Scherer, F; Soo, J; et al. (2019). "Dynamic risk profiling using serial tumor biomarkers for personalized outcome prediction". Cell. 178 (3): 699–713.e19. doi:10.1016/j.cell.2019.06.040. PMID 31348886.
- Nesselbush, MC; Luca, BA; Jeon, YJ; Jabara, I; et al. (2025). "An ultrasensitive method for detection of cell-free RNA". Nature. doi:10.1038/s41586-025-08739-5.
