= Agnostic (disambiguation) =

A person is agnostic, or embraces agnosticism, if they are unsure about the existence of God or the divine. Other meanings of the term include:

- Agnostic (data) – Computer program able to receive multiple data formats
- Cross-platform software – Computer software installed on multiple computing platforms
- Language-agnostic – Software paradigm independent of language
- Schema-agnostic databases
- Tissue-agnostic cancer drug
- Tumor-agnostic minimal residual disease – Type of minimal residual disease
