= Tumor-agnostic minimal residual disease =

Type of minimal residual disease

Tumor-agnostic minimal residual disease (MRD) testing, also referred to as tumor-naive, tumor-uninformed, or tumor-agnostic MRD (taMRD) testing, is an approach for detecting minimal residual disease (MRD) using circulating tumor DNA (ctDNA) analysis that does not require prior sequencing of a tumor tissue. Instead, these assays analyze a blood plasma sample directly using pre-designed panels targeting molecular alterations commonly found across various cancers or specific cancer types.

Tumor-agnostic MRD tests are employed to detect residual cancer cells after treatment, monitor for recurrence, and assess treatment response, particularly when primary tumor tissue is unavailable or when a faster turnaround time is needed. Key approaches include fixed NGS panels and methylation-based assays.

== Uses ==
Tumor-agnostic MRD assays are utilized in similar clinical contexts as tumor-informed approaches, including post-treatment surveillance, risk stratification, and monitoring therapy response. Several methylation-based assays have demonstrated prognostic significance in head and neck cancer and colorectal cancer, correlating MRD positivity with worse relapse-free survival. Fixed NGS panels have also shown utility, sometimes used in combination with tumor-informed markers. Because no primary tumor sample is required, taMRD testing can be used when tissue is unavailable, insufficient, degraded, or was collected years prior. Further, bypassing the tumor sequencing and custom assay design steps allows for a potentially faster time-to-result for the initial MRD test. It also simplifies future testing as the workflow relies solely on standardized blood collection and processing using a common assay panel.

== Mechanism ==
Tumor-agnostic MRD assays analyze the cell-free DNA (cfDNA) extracted from plasma using standardized panels designed to probe specific types of cancer biomarkers such as copy number variation, mutations, or DNA methylation status. NGS panel based assays use pre-defined, targeted NGS panels that interrogate hundreds or thousands of genomic regions frequently mutated or altered (e.g., single nucleotide variants, copy number alterations, fusions) in specific cancer types or across multiple cancers (pan-cancer panels). The presence of ctDNA is inferred if variants included in the panel are detected above background noise levels. Whereas, DNA methylation-based assays leverage distinct methylation pattern of cancer cells and analyze cfDNA for cancer-specific methylation signatures. Techniques may involve enrichment of methylated DNA fragments (e.g., using methylated DNA immunoprecipitation sequencing (MeDIP-seq)) followed by sequencing, or targeted analysis of specific differentially methylated regions known to be associated with cancer. Because these epigenetic patterns can be broadly altered in malignancy, this approach is inherently tumor-agnostic.

== Limitations ==
Because the fixed panel targets common alterations, it may not include many of the specific mutations present in an individual patient's tumor. Consequently, the detectable signal may be weaker, potentially leading to lower analytical sensitivity compared to tumor-informed assays that track multiple patient-specific variants, especially at very low ctDNA fractions. Further, fixed mutation panels may be more susceptible to detecting non-tumor-derived mutations from clonal hematopoiesis of indeterminate potential (CHIP), which can cause false-positive MRD results if not carefully filtered computationally. Tumor-informed methods inherently mitigate this by confirming variants originate from the tumor. Further, the assay's performance relies heavily on the comprehensiveness and relevance of the genes or methylation markers included in the fixed panel for the specific cancer type being assessed. A panel might miss MRD if the patient's tumor harbors primarily private mutations not included in the panel. Finally, regardless of the specific panel type (mutation or methylation), advanced bioinformatics are required to distinguish low-level ctDNA signals from background biological and technical noise.

=== Comparison with tumor-informed MRD ===
While some studies suggest comparable performance in specific scenarios, others indicate potential advantages in sensitivity or prognostic power for tumor-informed methods, particularly when ctDNA levels are very low. The optimal choice between tumor-agnostic and tumor-informed testing may depend on factors like tumor type, stage, availability of tissue, required sensitivity, and turnaround time needs.

== Examples of assays ==
Several commercial platforms for taMRD detection are available for clinical as well as research use. Notable examples include predicineALERT (predicine), AVENIO (Roche), Guardant reveal (Guardant Health) and NavDX (Naveris).

== See also ==
- Minimal residual disease
- Circulating tumor DNA (ctDNA)
- Liquid biopsy
- Next-generation sequencing (NGS)
- DNA methylation
- Tumor-informed MRD
- Clonal hematopoiesis
