= Tumor-informed minimal residual disease =

Type of minimal residual disease

Tumor-informed minimal residual disease (MRD) testing, often abbreviated as tiMRD, is a highly sensitive, personalized approach for detecting and monitoring minimal residual disease (MRD) in cancer patients. It primarily analyzes circulating tumor DNA (ctDNA)—small fragments of DNA shed from tumor cells into the blood plasma. This method addresses limitations of traditional cancer staging in identifying individuals with minimal residual disease after treatment, who are at high risk of relapse.

Tumor-informed assays are custom-built for each patient by typically sequencing the patient's tumor tissue to identify its unique set of somatic mutations, and then creating a personalized panel to track these specific markers in subsequent blood tests. This personalized approach is primarily applied in solid tumors—including colorectal cancer, lung cancer, breast cancer, and bladder cancer—to assess recurrence risk, monitor treatment response, and potentially guide adjuvant therapy decisions.

== Uses ==
tiMRD testing has many clinical applications in oncology care through the lifecycle of detection, treatment, monitoring, and prevention.

=== Detection ===
Post-operative ctDNA detection is a strong independent predictor of recurrence risk across multiple cancers, including colorectal, lung, and bladder cancer. Patients testing positive for MRD after surgery have a significantly higher risk of relapse compared to those testing negative. For example, in the GALAXY study (CRC), patients positive at 4 weeks post-surgery had a hazard ratio for recurrence of 12 compared to negative patients.

=== Monitoring ===
Serial ctDNA monitoring can detect molecular relapse several months earlier than standard radiographic imaging. Studies report median lead times of approximately 5 months or more. This provides a potential window for earlier intervention.

=== Treatment and prevention ===
A major focus is using post-operative MRD status to guide adjuvant therapy decisions. Clinical trials are underway (e.g., CIRCULATE-Japan VEGA/ALTAIR for CRC) investigating whether MRD-positive patients benefit from initiated or intensified ACT, and if MRD-negative patients can safely forgo ACT, thus sparing them toxicity. Initial studies suggest ctDNA status is a better predictor of ACT benefit than traditional staging. Changes in ctDNA levels during systemic therapy (chemotherapy, targeted therapy, immunotherapy) can reflect treatment efficacy earlier than imaging.

Clinical validation studies have demonstrated high performance of tiMRD tests. For instance, in colorectal cancer surveillance, certain tiMRD assays show sensitivity for detecting recurrence around 90% with serial testing and specificity exceeding 90%.

== Mechanism ==
The performance of a tiMRD test relies heavily on the design of mutation panel relevant to the disease and/or a cohort of the patient. This typically involves:

1. Tumor and matched healthy sample sequencing—A biopsy or surgical sample of the patient's tumor tissue, along with a matched normal sample (typically peripheral blood leukocytes), undergoes comprehensive genomic analysis, often Whole exome sequencing (WES) or Whole genome sequencing (WGS), to identify somatic mutations unique to the tumor.
2. Panel design—A subset of confirmed somatic mutations (often prioritizing clonal or truncal variants likely present throughout the tumor) is selected. Typically, dozens to hundreds of variants (e.g., up to 200 in some assays) are chosen. Patient-specific primers for targeted multiplex PCR amplification or capture probes for targeted NGS are designed against these selected variants. Techniques like molecular barcoding may be employed during library preparation to reduce sequencing errors and improve detection accuracy.
3. Serial plasma monitoring—Following assay design, only peripheral blood samples are needed for monitoring. Cell-free DNA (cfDNA) is extracted from the plasma fraction. The personalized assay (e.g., targeted NGS or mPCR) is applied to detect and quantify ctDNA carrying the patient-specific mutations. Ultrasensitive detection is required, often aiming for a limit of detection (LOD) well below 0.1% variant allele frequency (VAF), with some assays achieving LODs of 0.01% to 0.005% VAF or lower (equivalent to detecting 1 mutant molecule amongst 10,000–20,000 wild-type molecules). Optimal timing for the first post-surgical test is typically recommended between 2 and 5 weeks after surgery to allow for clearance of ctDNA released during the procedure. Subsequent monitoring occurs serially (e.g., every 3–6 months) during surveillance or treatment.

By tracking multiple (often dozens or hundreds) confirmed somatic mutations known to originate from the patient's tumor, tiMRD assays can achieve high analytical sensitivity, allowing detection of very low ctDNA levels typical in the MRD setting. Specificity is enhanced because the assay targets variants confirmed absent in the patient's matched normal DNA, effectively filtering out background noise from non-tumor sources like clonal hematopoiesis of indeterminate potential (CHIP). Further, ctDNA analysis, even though based on initial tumor sample, may provide a more comprehensive snapshot of overall tumor burden and heterogeneity compared to single-site tissue biopsies, as ctDNA is shed from various tumor sites.

== Limitations ==
The major challenge of tiMRD stems from the requirement of having adequate quality and quantity of tumor sample from initial diagnosis/surgery, which may be unavailable or degraded, and matched healthy tissue. This results in longer assay design time and higher costs, delaying the start of monitoring. Further, detecting the extremely low fraction of ctDNA present in early-stage disease or post-treatment remains challenging, potentially leading to false negatives, especially if tumor shedding is inherently low.

While serial testing can improve sensitivity over single time points, the mutational landscape of a tumor can evolve over time reducing assay's effectiveness due to loss of mutations selected for the initial panel. However, targeting clonal/truncal mutations can minimize this risk.

Finally, there is significant heterogeneity between different commercial and laboratory-developed tiMRD assays regarding the number of genes sequenced, variants tracked, bioinformatics pipelines, and performance characteristics. This lack of standardization complicates cross-study comparisons and widespread clinical adoption, and requires harmonization efforts.

== Examples of assays ==
Several commercial and research-based tumor-informed MRD assays exist. Notable examples include: Signatera (Natera), RaDaR (Inivata / NeoGenomics, RUO only), Oncodetect (Exact Sciences), PCM™ (ArcherDX, RUO only), MRDetect (C2i Genomics, RUO only), PhasED-seq (Foresight Diagnostics, RUO only). These assays vary in their specific methodologies (e.g., number of variants tracked, sequencing technology).

== See also ==
- Minimal residual disease
- Tumor-agnostic minimal residual disease
- Circulating tumor DNA (ctDNA)
- Liquid biopsy
- Whole exome sequencing (WES)
- Next-generation sequencing (NGS)
- Solid tumor
- Colorectal cancer
- Personalized medicine
- Clonal hematopoiesis
