= Cancer Likelihood in Plasma =

Cancer Likelihood in Plasma (CLiP) is a set of ensemble learning methods for integrating various genomic features useful for the noninvasive detection of early cancers from blood plasma. An application of this technique for early detection of lung cancer (Lung-CLiP) was originally described by Chabon et al. (2020) from the labs of Ash Alizadeh and Max Diehn at Stanford.

== Methods ==
This method relies on several improvements to cancer personalized profiling by deep sequencing (CAPP-Seq) for analysis of circulating tumor DNA (ctDNA). The CLiP technique integrates multiple distinctive genomic features of a cancer of interest findings within a machine-learning framework for cancer detection. For example, studies have shown that the majority of somatic mutations found in cell-free DNA (cfDNA) are not tumor derived, but instead reflect clonal hematopoeisis (also known as CHIP). Even though CHIP tends to target specific genes, it also involves many generally non-recurrent mutations that can be shed from leukocytes and detected in cfDNA, regardless of whether profiling patients with cancer and healthy adults. However, genuine tumor derived ctDNA mutations can be distinguished from CHIP-derived mutations. This is because unlike tumor-derived mutations, CHIP-derived mutations that are shed from leukocytes into plasma tend to occur on longer cfDNA fragments, and to lack specific mutational signatures such as those associated with tobacco smoking in lung cancer that are also found in tumor derived ctDNA molecules. CLiP integrates these features within hierarchical ensemble machine learning models that consider somatic mutations and copy number alternations, among other features. While the CLiP method is unique in relying exclusively on mutations and copy number alterations, it is related to a variety of other liquid biopsy methods being commercially developed for early cancer detection using ctDNA and proteins (e.g., CancerSEEK / DETECT-A), cfDNA fragmentation patterns (e.g., DELFI), and DNA methylation (e.g., cfMeDIP-Seq, Grail).

While the CLiP method has not yet been broadly applied for population-based cancer screening, it has been shown to distinguish discriminate early-stage lung cancers from risk-matched controls across multiple cohorts of patients enrolled across the US.
