= Ordered two-template relay =

Sequencing technique for non-coding RNA

Ordered Two-Template Relay (OTTR) is a library preparation technique used to improve quantitation of highly modified non-coding RNA (ncRNA) species, which have been difficult to characterize using traditional cDNA sequencing approaches. OTTR leverages a retroelement reverse transcriptase (RT), termed BoMoC, with template jumping properties and high processivity across modified RNA templates, to generate cDNA products for next-generation sequencing (NGS). Overall, OTTR offers a streamlined approach for cDNA library production of full-length and modified ncRNA targets.

== Background ==
Cellular ncRNA pools are known to be dynamically regulated and can have high degrees of variation between different cell types and developmental stages. Dysregulation of transfer RNAs (tRNAs), a type of ncRNA, has been linked to a diverse array of detrimental physiological conditions including neurological diseases and cancer. While characterization of transfer RNA (tRNAs) diversity is relevant to disease, current library preparation approaches are limited in their ability to capture highly modified tRNA bases, which block reverse transcriptase and interfere with the production of full-length cDNA intermediates needed for sequencing. To date, several cDNA library preparation techniques, including OTTR, have attempted to overcome these problems and improve our ability to characterize ncRNA pools.

== OTTR Workflow ==
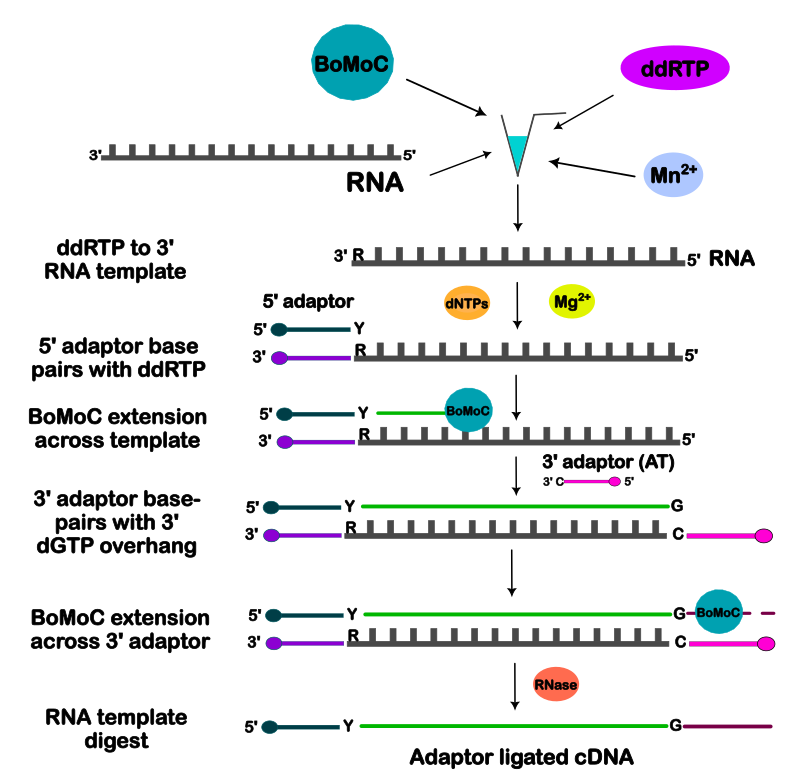
OTTR: Ordered Two-Template Relay diagram, highlighting the steps involved in dual-end adaptor cDNA library synthesis from RNA. Adapted from Upton et al., 2021.

=== BoMoC Reverse Transcriptase ===
Reverse transcriptases (RTs) are polymerases capable of synthesizing complementary DNA (cDNA) using either RNA and DNA templates and have become essential biotechnology tools in both clinical and laboratory settings. OTTR makes use of a unique non-long terminal repeat (LTR) retroelement RT called BoMoC, due to its specialized ability to synthesize cDNA opposite templates containing modified bases or sugar backbones and being highly processive across discontinuous RNA templates. Originally purified from the silk moth Bombyx mori, OTTR BoMoC is N-terminally truncated and modified to introduce a stabilizing active site mutation.

=== cDNA Synthesis ===
Initially, the RNA or DNA of interest is purified and denoted as the input template (IT). The OTTR library preparation protocol require the IT is incubated with BoMoC, which uses terminal transferase or 'tailing' activity' to add a chain-terminating dideoxynucleotide base, ddRTP (ddATP or ddGTP), to the 3' end of the IT, in the presence of manganese (Mn^{2+}). To promote cDNA synthesis in the steps to follow, the divalent cation source is switched to magnesium (Mg^{2+}), free ddRTPs are inactivated and dNTPs are added. Next, a RNA-DNA duplex, containing a 3' +1Y (dTTP or dCTP) base overhang is added, allowing the RNA-DNA duplex to base pair with the ddRTP-containing IT. BoMoC extends from the 3' of the +1Y base across the IT. Following this, dNTP concentrations are altered to encourage the addition of dGTP to the 3' end of the cDNA IT through the non-template nucleotide addition (NTA) activity of BoMoC. A 3' adaptor template (AT) containing a 3' dCTP is added to the reaction, promoting base pairing between the cDNA 3' G overhang and the 3'C base of the AT and subsequent extension by BoMoC. When using RNA as the input template, addition of RNase A and RNase H is needed to degrade remaining RNA, leaving only the cDNA template.

=== Library preparation for sequencing ===
Based on the sequencing approach used, the 5' and 3' adaptor sequences used to tag the cDNA library can be altered as needed. Previously, dual adapter-tagged cDNA libraries have been characterized using Illumina NGS. Low-cycle PCR can also be used to index universal adaptor cDNA libraries following the RT reaction. Alternatively, full-length adaptor sequences of choice can be included in the 5' and 3' adaptors used in the initial RT reaction.

== Applications ==
To date, OTTR has been used for quantifying tRNA species. This method provides a reliable and precise quantification of tRNAs and allows for the detection of changes in tRNA levels under different physiological conditions. Therefore, this method is useful for a variety of research applications in the field of molecular biology and genetics.

As tRNAs are essential components of translation, the ability to quantify tRNA levels accurately is crucial for understanding how the translation machinery is regulated. Using OTTR, researchers can determine changes in tRNA levels in response to different growth conditions, environmental stress, or genetic modifications. This information can help to identify factors that affect tRNA abundance and their potential roles in modulating translation.

In particular, the OTTR protocol has been used to characterize the small RNA composition of mammalian sperm populations. This work revealed that sperm small RNA pools are composed largely of rRNA fragments and both 5' and 3' tRNA halves from the majority of tRNAs. This improved understanding of sperm payload composition has implications for our understanding of the biogenesis of structural RNA fragments in the male germline, as well as the biochemical nature of the RNAs delivered to the zygote upon fertilization.

The OTTR protocol could also be used in the study of piwi-interacting RNAs (piRNAs), which is another important classes of small RNAs. While the applications of OTTR have mainly been focused on tRNA fragment detection, OTTR has also been shown to perform well in the capture of miRNAs which could be useful for the study of miRNA expression patterns in different cell types or under different conditions.

Future applications of protocols similar to OTTR are also being considered in the development of diagnostic assays for small RNAs. The high fidelity of the OTTR protocol in capturing small RNAs could make it an attractive option when paired with liquid biopsy assays, where circulating small RNAs are analyzed as biomarkers for various diseases.

== Advantages and Limitations ==
=== Advantages ===
- Full-length ncRNA capture – BoMoC has high processivity across modified RNA templates resulting in the production of more full-length cDNA products compared to common reverse transcriptase's, which are prone to premature termination at modified sites.
- Single tube reaction – All cDNA synthesis steps can be performed in a single tube, without the need for intermediate purification steps. This allows for automation of the OTTR approach. Additionally, this reduces the total amount of input RNA required purification steps, prone to loss of
- Capture of modified sites – Mis-incorporation signatures of BoMoC across modified RNA bases have been characterized. Therefore, OTTR allows for the identification of modification status of RNA transcripts where modified sites are known.
- Sequencing of both RNA and DNA templates – While RNA templates have been used to benchmark the OTTR technique, BoMoC is processive over DNA, meaning this library preparation approach could be adapted for DNA characterization.

=== Limitations ===
- Identification of novel modified sites – BoMoC does not capture the modification directly but rather the mis-incorporation signature resulting from the modified base. Therefore, sites where modification status has not been previously established may be difficult to confirm the identity of the modification.
- Pre-mature termination of cDNA – Approximately, 10% of miRNA species characterized using OTTR experience prematurely terminated cDNA products. While these levels are low compared to common reverse transcriptase, some species carrying very bulky modifications may be challenging to capture with OTTR.
- Diversity in species used for benchmarking – To date, miRNA and tRNA pools have been characterized with OTTR. However, more validation, with diverse RNA and DNA species will increase the potential applications of OTTR.
