= Patrick O. Brown =

American scientist and businessman

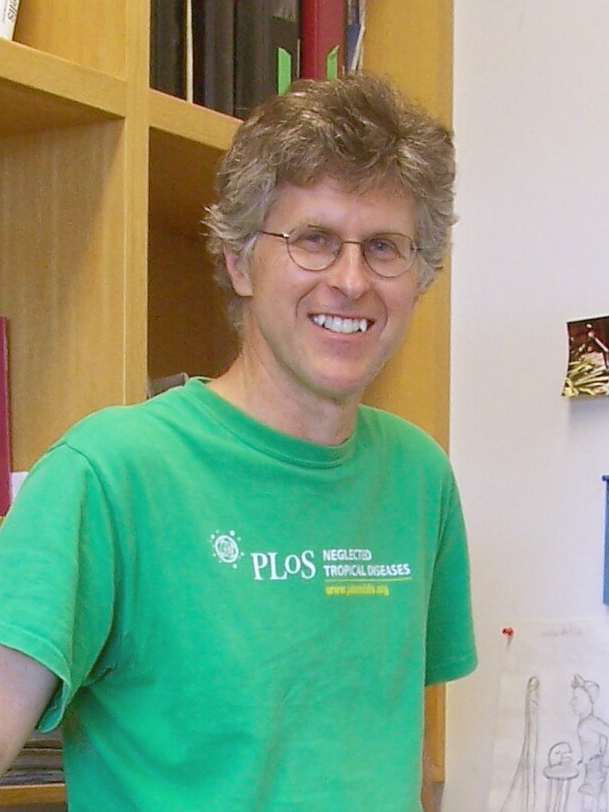
- Brown in 2009
- Born: Patrick O'Reilly Brown; 1954 (age 71–72); Washington, D.C., U.S.
- Other name: Pat
- Education: University of Chicago (BS, MD, PhD)
- Known for: Impossible Foods, DNA microarrays Public Library of Science
- Awards: NAS Award in Molecular Biology (2000); Takeda award (2002); Curt Stern Award (2005)
- Scientific career
- Fields: Biochemistry
- Workplaces: Stanford University
- Thesis: Studies on DNA Topoisomerases (1980)
- Doctoral advisor: Nicholas Cozzarelli
- Doctoral students: Kathleen Rubins; Joseph DeRisi
- Website: brownlab.stanford.edu www.hhmi.org/research/investigators/brown_bio.html

Patrick O'Reilly Brown (born 1954) is an American geneticist and businessman who is the founder of Impossible Foods Inc. and professor emeritus in the department of biochemistry at Stanford University. Brown is co-founder of the Public Library of Science, inventor of the DNA microarray, and a former investigator at Howard Hughes Medical Institute.

== Education ==
Brown received each of his degrees from the University of Chicago, including his B.S. in 1976 and M.D. in 1982. His Ph.D., granted in 1980 while under the guidance of Nicholas R. Cozzarelli, involved the study of DNA topoisomerases.

== Academic career ==
After getting his medical degree in 1982, Brown completed a 3-year pediatric residency at Children's Memorial Hospital in Chicago but decided he could have a greater impact through basic research. In 1985, Brown took a 3-year postdoctoral fellowship at the University of California, San Francisco with J. Michael Bishop and Harold Varmus (who shared the 1989 Nobel Prize in Medicine for their discoveries about how genes can ignite cancerous tumors). At UCSF, Brown and colleagues defined the mechanism by which retroviruses, such as the HIV virus, integrate their genes into the genome of the cells they infect, which helped lead to development of new drugs to fight the disease.

In 1988, Brown became an investigator of the Howard Hughes Medical Institute and an assistant professor in the department of biochemistry at Stanford University School of Medicine, where he continued to investigate retroviral replication. In the early 1990s, Brown began developing a new technology to enable systematic investigation of the behavior and properties of whole genomes—called DNA microarrays. "I had a mental image of a DNA microarray, even including the red and green fluorescent spots, a few years before I'd figured out the details of making them," Brown told The Scientist.

Brown and his colleagues created a robotic dispenser that could deposit minute quantities of tens of thousands of individual genes onto a single glass slide, a "DNA microarray" or "gene chip." By flooding the slide with fluorescently labeled genetic material derived from a living sample, a researcher could see which genes were being expressed in cells. Shortly after their first description of DNA microarrays, the Brown laboratory published a "how-to" manual on the Web that helped these robotic devices become standard equipment in life science labs throughout the world, in an effort led by Joe DeRisi, Michael Eisen, Ash Alizadeh, and others.

Brown and his colleagues developed experimental methods for using DNA microarrays to investigate basic principles of genome organization, gene expression, cell regulation and specialization, physiology, development and disease, and the microbiome, along with statistical and computational tools for visualizing and interpreting the resulting large volumes of data. This work was especially revealing for the molecular portraits of many human cancers including lymphomas such as DLBCL, breast cancers, and other tumors, as part of diverse global collaborations including David Botstein, Michael Eisen, Lou Staudt, Ash Alizadeh, and others. Microarray technologies are widely used for comparing gene expression patterns and other genome features among individuals and their tissues and cells, providing information on disease subcategories, disease prognosis, and treatment outcome.

Starting in the late 1990s, Brown began publicly voicing concern over what he called "a fundamentally flawed process of scientific publishing," in which academics typically published results of publicly funded research in private, commercial publishing houses that charged subscription fees for access to journals. "We viewed this entire process as being patently unfair. Not only were scientists in poor countries being denied access to the latest and best information out there, but the public who supports this research was being denied access as well. We felt there simply had to be a better way to do it," Brown told a University of Chicago medical journal.

Brown began a collaboration with other scientists, including Harold Varmus (then director of the National Institutes of Health), David J. Lipman (then director of the National Center for Biotechnology Information), and Michael Eisen of Lawrence Berkeley National Laboratory, to overhaul the scientific and medical publishing systems to make papers available on the rapidly developing Internet platforms such as Usenet and the World Wide Web. "Why should publishers be able to control what I can do with information that was published by my scientific colleagues whose motivation was exactly to have their discoveries contribute to future discoveries? ... We had already existing tools that we could use to so to speak hyperlink things so that you could reorganize information in systematic ways, but they weren't really being exploited by the conventional scientific literature," Brown said in an interview with BioMedCentral Biology. The magazine Nature reported that the scientists' open-access movement could "spell the end for many print titles"; Brown called subscription-based scientific journals "anachronisms."

In 2001, Brown, Eisen and Varmus co-founded the Public Library of Science (PLOS) to make published scientific research open access and freely available to researchers in the scientific community. Funded by a grant from the Gordon and Betty Moore Foundation, the non-profit organization advocated for designing alternative systems to fund for scientific publishing.

In 2002, Brown was elected to the United States National Academy of Sciences, identifying him as one of the top 2000 scientists in the nation. He is a member of the National Academy of Medicine and a Fellow of the American Association for the Advancement of Science.

== Impossible Foods ==
In 2009, Brown took an 18-month sabbatical where he considered how to spend the rest of his career. Brown decided that the world's largest environmental problem, and the problem where he could have the most impact, was the use of animals to produce food. He organized a conference to raise awareness of the problem. But the National Research Council workshop, called "The Role of Animal Agriculture in a Sustainable 21st Century Global Food System," had minimal impact; soon after, he decided the best way to reduce animal agriculture was to offer a competing product in the free market.

By the end of his sabbatical, Brown had articulated the first steps of his business plan and began to recruit a small team of scientists to determine precisely why meat smells, handles, cooks and tastes like meat. Brown said he had a "hunch" that the key to meat's unique taste was its high abundance of heme, an iron-containing molecule in blood that carries oxygen and is found in all living organisms. Brown theorized that, if he could generate large amounts of heme from plant sources, he could recreate the taste of animal meat.

Brown and a small group of early employees tested the hunch by digging up clover roots, which for the plant kingdom contain high amounts of heme. "I dissected them off with a razor blade then blended them up just to see what I could extract. I was just poking around, feasibility-testing some ideas. I got to a point where, though I didn't have much data, I had enough to go and talk to some venture-capital companies — of which there are a ridiculous number in Silicon Valley — and hit them for some money," Brown told The Sunday Times. Brown raised $9 million and founded Impossible Foods in July 2011. Over eight years until 2019, the business had collected $396 million from investors like Bill Gates, Google Ventures and Li Ka-shing's Horizons Ventures.

Brown and his team then spent five years researching and developing the Impossible Burger, which launched in restaurants in 2016. Impossible Foods is also working on plant-based pork, chicken, fish and dairy products made without any animals.

The safety of soy leghemoglobin produced by genetically engineered yeast was questioned by the FDA in 2015. However, in 2018 the FDA stated that it had "no questions" regarding the safety or regulatory compliance of Impossible Foods' soy leghemoglobin, a decision which has since been upheld by the Ninth Circuit Court of Appeals.

Brown strongly supports labeling Impossible Foods' products as "meat," regardless of its source. In a 2018 interview with Quartz, he noted, "animals have just been the technology we have used up until now to produce meat... What consumers value about meat has nothing to do with how it's made. They just live with the fact that it's made from animals. If we're producing a product that is delivering everything that is of value in meat for consumers, it's filling that niche." This assessment, according to Brown, appropriately categorizes meat by "what functional role it plays," rather than its source of origin. These statements have put Brown at odds with the meat industry, which by mid-2019 had successfully pressured state legislatures in Missouri and Arkansas to pass laws barring plant-based protein manufacturers such as Impossible Foods and competitor Beyond Meat from labeling their products as "meat."

The United Nations Framework Convention on Climate Change strongly endorses Brown's venture and vision, saying that animal-based meat is a "problem" and that in order to "achieve the United Nations Sustainable Development Goals, the global food system must undergo transformative change... By replacing animal products, consumers have enormous power to spare land for biodiversity and carbon capture, halt greenhouse gas emissions at the source, and alleviate demand on fresh water needed for healthy ecosystems." Research on meats and no-meat substitutes suggests that no-meat products offer substantial benefits over the production of beef, and to a lesser extent pork and chicken, in terms of greenhouse gas production, water and land use.

== Awards ==
In 2000, Brown received the National Academy of Sciences Award in Molecular Biology.

In 2002 he received a Takeda award, recognizing his work in "the development of DNA microarrays with pre-synthesized DNA probes and the promotion of the technology by releasing the production methods on the Internet."

In 2005 he received the Curt Stern Award for his contributions to the development and application of gene-based expression microarrays.

In 2006 he received the American Cancer Society's Medal of Honor for Basic Research, acknowledging "his revolutionary development of low-cost, accessible automated microarrays, and his life-saving contributions to the field of functional genomics...which in turn has produced insights into critical genetic information for diseases such as leukemia, lymphoma, prostate cancer, and early stage breast cancer."

In 2010 the Association of Biomolecular Resource Facilities (ABRF) selected Brown for the ABRF 2010 Award in recognition of Brown's pioneering work in the development of microarrays and the diverse applications of this technology in genetic research. That year, he also was awarded the Award for Excellence in Molecular Diagnostics by the Association for Molecular Pathology.

In 2016, Klaus Schwab and the World Economic Forum named Brown and his company a "Technology Pioneer" for their design, development and deployment of new technologies and innovations "poised to have a significant impact on business and society." Their citation reads: "Impossible Foods is creating meat and dairy substitutes directly from plants. They aim to eliminate the destructive environmental impact of the global animal farming industry by inventing sustainable and scalable ways to produce delicious, nutritious and affordable meat and dairy foods. Their technology transforms nutrients from plant crops directly into foods that have the flavours and textures of meat and dairy products, with all of the nutritional value."

In 2018, the United Nations Environment Programme named Impossible Foods and Beyond Meat joint winners of the Champions of the Earth Award, in the Science and Innovation category. Pat Brown and Ethan Brown (the CEO of Beyond Meat, who is unrelated) were awarded the award for production of sustainable alternatives to beef meats.
