= Digital polymerase chain reaction =

Biotechnological procedure

Digital polymerase chain reaction (digital PCR, DigitalPCR, dPCR, or dePCR) is a biotechnological refinement of conventional polymerase chain reaction methods that can be used to directly quantify and clonally amplify nucleic acids strands including DNA, cDNA, or RNA. The key difference between dPCR and qPCR lies in the method of measuring nucleic acids amounts, with the former being a more precise method than PCR, though also more prone to error in the hands of inexperienced users. PCR carries out one reaction per single sample. dPCR also carries out a single reaction within a sample, however the sample is separated into a large number of partitions and the reaction is carried out in each partition individually. This separation allows a more reliable collection and sensitive measurement of nucleic acid amounts. The method has been demonstrated as useful for studying variations in gene sequences—such as copy number variants and point mutations.

== Principles ==
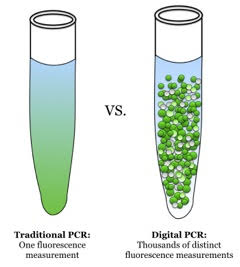
Comparison of quantitative PCR and digital PCR

The polymerase chain reaction method is used to quantify nucleic acids by amplifying a nucleic acid molecule with the enzyme DNA polymerase. Conventional PCR is based on the theory that amplification is exponential. Therefore, nucleic acids may be quantified by comparing the number of amplification cycles and amount of PCR end-product to those of a reference sample. However, many factors complicate this calculation, creating uncertainties and inaccuracies. These factors include the following: initial amplification cycles may not be exponential; PCR amplification eventually plateaus after an uncertain number of cycles; and low initial concentrations of target nucleic acid molecules may not amplify to detectable levels. However, the most significant limitation of PCR is that PCR amplification efficiency in a sample of interest may be different from that of reference samples.

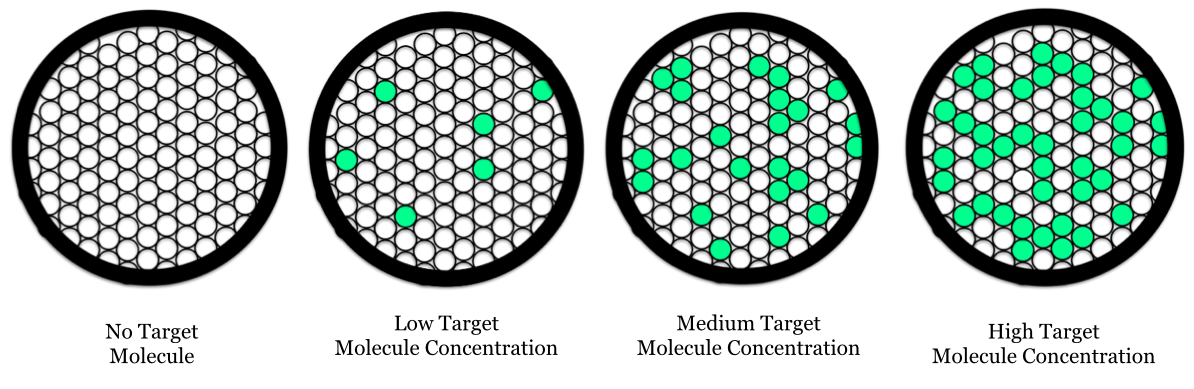
Oil droplets containing fluorescent PCR target molecule

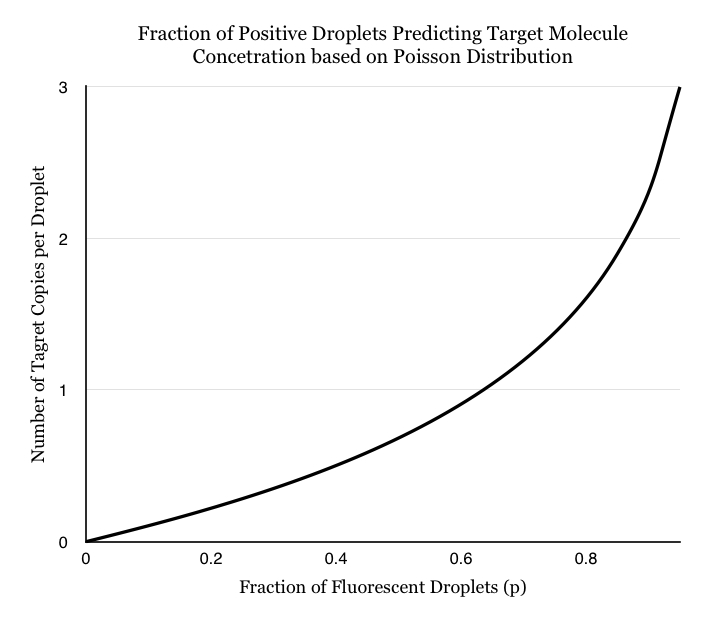
Fraction of positive droplets predict number of target copies per droplet modeled by the Poisson distribution

Instead of performing one reaction per well, dPCR involves partitioning the PCR solution into tens of thousands of nano-liter-sized droplets, where a separate PCR reaction takes place in each one. A PCR solution is made similarly to a TaqMan assay, which consists of template DNA (or RNA), fluorescence-quencher probes, primers, and a PCR master mix, which contains DNA polymerase, dNTPs, MgCl_{2}, and reaction buffers at optimal concentrations. Several different methods can be used to partition samples, including microwell plates, capillaries, oil emulsion, and arrays of miniaturized chambers with nucleic acid binding surfaces. The PCR solution is partitioned into smaller units, each with the necessary components for amplification. The partitioned units are then subjected to thermocycling so that each unit may independently undergo PCR amplification. After multiple PCR amplification cycles, the samples are checked for fluorescence with a binary readout of "0" or "1". The fraction of fluorescing droplets is recorded. The partitioning of the sample allows one to estimate the number of different molecules by assuming that the molecule population follows the Poisson distribution, thus accounting for the possibility of multiple target molecules inhabiting a single droplet. Using Poisson's law of small numbers, the distribution of target molecule within the sample can be accurately approximated allowing for a quantification of the target strand in the PCR product. This model simply predicts that as the number of samples containing at least one target molecule increases, the probability of the samples containing more than one target molecule increases. In conventional PCR, the number of PCR amplification cycles is proportional to the starting copy number. Different from many people's belief that dPCR provides absolute quantification, digital PCR uses statistical power to provide relative quantification. For example, if Sample A, when assayed in 1 million partitions, gives one positive reaction, it does not mean that the Sample A has one starting molecule.

The benefits of dPCR include increased precision through massive sample partitioning, which ensures reliable measurements in the desired DNA sequence due to reproducibility. Error rates are larger when detecting small-fold change differences with basic PCR, while error rates are smaller with dPCR due to the smaller-fold change differences that can be detected in DNA sequence. The technique itself reduces the use of a larger volume of reagent needed, which inevitably will lower experiment cost. Also, dPCR is highly quantitative as it does not rely on relative fluorescence of the solution to determine the amount of amplified target DNA.

== Comparison between dPCR and real-time PCR (qPCR) ==
dPCR measures the actual number of molecules (target DNA) as each molecule is in one droplet, thus making it a discrete "digital" measurement. It provides absolute quantification because dPCR measures the positive fraction of samples, which is the number of droplets that are fluorescing due to proper amplification. This positive fraction accurately indicates the initial amount of template nucleic acid. Similarly, real-time PCR (qPCR) utilizes fluorescence; however, it measures the intensity of fluorescence at specific times (generally after every amplification cycle) to determine the relative amount of target molecule (DNA), but cannot specify the exact amount without constructing a standard curve using different amounts of a defined standard. It gives the threshold per cycle (CT) and the difference in CT is used to calculate the amount of initial nucleic acid. As such, qPCR is an analog measurement, which may not be as precise due to the extrapolation required to attain a measurement.

dPCR measures the amount of DNA after amplification is complete and then determines the fraction of replicates. This is representative of an endpoint measurement as it requires the observation of the data after the experiment is completed. In contrast, qPCR records the relative fluorescence of the DNA at specific points during the amplification process, which requires stops in the experimental process. This "real-time" aspect of qPCR may theoretically affect results due to the stopping of the experiment. In practice, however, most qPCR thermal cyclers read each sample's fluorescence very quickly at the end of the annealing/extension step before proceeding to the next melting step, meaning this hypothetical concern is not actually relevant or applicable for the vast majority of researchers. dPCR measures the amplification by measuring the products of end point PCR cycling and is therefore less susceptible to the artifacts arising from impaired amplification efficiencies due to the presence of PCR inhibitors or primer template mismatch.

Real-time digital PCR (rdPCR) combines the methodologies of digital PCR (dPCR) and quantitative PCR (qPCR), integrating the precision of dPCR with the real-time analysis capabilities of qPCR. This integration aims to provide enhanced sensitivity, specificity, and the ability for absolute quantification of nucleic acid sequences, contributing to the quantification of genetic material in scientific and clinical research.

qPCR is unable to distinguish differences in gene expression or copy number variations that are smaller than twofold. On the other hand, dPCR has a higher precision and has been shown to detect differences of less than 30% in gene expression, distinguish between copy number variations that differ by only 1 copy, and identify alleles that occur at frequencies less than 0.1%.

== Applications ==
Digital PCR has many applications in basic research, clinical diagnostics and environmental testing. Its uses include pathogen detection and digestive health analysis; liquid biopsy for cancer monitoring, organ transplant rejection monitoring and non-invasive prenatal testing for serious genetic abnormalities; copy number variation analysis, single gene expression analysis, rare sequence detection, gene expression profiling and single-cell analysis; the detection of DNA contaminants in bioprocessing, the validation of gene edits and detection of specific methylation changes in DNA as biomarkers of cancer, as well as plasmid copy number determination in bacterial populations. dPCR is also frequently used as an orthogonal method to confirm rare mutations detected through next-generation sequencing (NGS) and to validate NGS libraries.

=== Absolute quantification ===
dPCR enables the absolute and reproducible quantification of target nucleic acids at single-molecule resolution. Compared to analogue quantitative PCR (qPCR), absolute quantification with dPCR does not require a standard curve. dPCR also has a greater tolerance for inhibitor substances and PCR assays that amplify inefficiently as compared to qPCR.

Example applications are: Quantifying the presence of specific sequences from contaminating genetically modified organisms in foodstuffs, viral load in the blood, PBMCs, serum samples, chorionic villi tissues, biomarkers of neurodegenerative disease in cerebral spinal fluid, and fecal contamination in drinking water.

=== Copy number variation ===
An alteration in copy number state with respect to a single-copy reference locus is referred to as a "copy number variation" (CNV) if it appears in germline cells, or a copy number alteration (CNA) if it appears in somatic cells. A CNV or CNA could be due to a deletion or amplification of a locus with respect to the number of copies of the reference locus present in the cell, and together, they are major contributors to variability in the human genome. They have been associated with cancers; neurological, psychiatric, and autoimmune diseases; and adverse drug reactions. However, it is difficult to measure these allelic variations with high precision using other methods such as qPCR, thus making phenotypic and disease associations with altered CNV status challenging.

The large number of "digitized," endpoint measurements made possible by sample partitioning enables dPCR to resolve small differences in copy number with better accuracy and precision when compared to other methods such as SNP-based microarrays or qPCR. qPCR is limited in its ability to precisely quantify gene amplifications in several diseases, including Crohn's disease, HIV-1 infection, and obesity.

dPCR was designed to measure the concentration of a nucleic acid target in copies per unit volume of the sample. When operating in dilute reactions where less than ~10% of the partitions contain a desired target (referred to as "limiting dilution"), copy number can be estimated by comparing the number of fluorescent droplets arising from a target CNV with the number of fluorescent droplets arising from an invariant single-copy reference locus. In fact, both at these lower target concentrations and at higher ones where multiple copies of the same target can co-localize to a single partition, Poisson statistics are used to correct for these multiple occupancies to give a more accurate value for each target's concentration.

Digital PCR has been used to uncover both germline and somatic variation in gene copy number between humans and to study the link between amplification of HER2 (ERBB2) and breast cancer progression.

=== Rare mutation and rare allele detection ===
Partitioning in digital PCR increases sensitivity and allows for detection of rare events, especially single nucleotide variants (SNVs), by isolating or greatly diminishing the target biomarker signal from potentially competing background. These events can be organized into two classes: rare mutation detection and rare sequence detection.

==== Rare mutation detection ====
Rare mutation detection occurs when a biomarker exists within a background of a highly abundant counterpart that differs by only a single nucleotide variant (SNV). Digital PCR has been shown to be capable of detecting mutant DNA in the presence of a 200,000-fold excess of wild type background, which is 2,000 times more sensitive than achievable with conventional qPCR.

==== Rare sequence detection ====
Digital PCR can detect rare sequences such as HIV DNA in patients with HIV, and DNA from fecal bacteria in ocean and other water samples for assessing water quality. dPCR can detect sequences as rare as 1 in every 1,250,000 cells.

==== Liquid biopsy ====
dPCR's ability to detect rare mutations may be of particular benefit in the clinic through the use of the liquid biopsy, a generally noninvasive strategy for detecting and monitoring disease via bodily fluids. Researchers have used liquid biopsy to monitor tumor load, treatment response and disease progression in cancer patients by measuring rare mutations in circulating tumor DNA (ctDNA) in a variety of biological fluids from patients including blood, urine and cerebrospinal fluid. Early detection of ctDNA (as in molecular relapse) may lead to earlier administration of an immunotherapy or a targeted therapy specific for the patient's mutation signature, potentially improving chances of the treatment's effectiveness rather than waiting for clinical relapse before altering treatment. Liquid biopsies can have turnaround times of a few days, compared to two to four weeks or longer for tissue-based tests. This reduced time to results has been used by physicians to expedite treatments tailored to biopsy data.

In 2016, a prospective trial using dPCR at the Dana-Farber Cancer Institute authenticated the clinical benefit of liquid biopsy as a predictive diagnostic tool for patients with non-small-cell lung cancer. The application of liquid biopsy tests have also been studied in patients with breast, colorectal, gynecologic, and bladder cancers to monitor both the disease load and the tumor's response to treatment.

=== Gene expression and RNA quantification ===
Gene expression and RNA quantification studies have benefited from the increased precision and absolute quantification of dPCR. RNA quantification can be accomplished via RT-PCR, wherein RNA is reverse-transcribed into cDNA in the partitioned reaction itself, and the number of RNA molecules originating from each transcript (or allelic transcript) is quantified via dPCR.

One can often achieve greater sensitivity and precision by using dPCR rather than qPCR to quantify RNA molecules in part because it does not require use of a standard curve for quantification. dPCR is also more resilient to PCR inhibitors for the quantification of RNA than qPCR.

dPCR can detect and quantify more individual target species per detection channel than qPCR by virtue of being able to distinguish targets based on their differential fluorescence amplitude or by the use of distinctive color combinations for their detection. As an example of this, a 2-channel dPCR system has been used to detect in a single well the expression of four different splice variants of human telomerase reverse transcriptase, a protein that is more active in most tumor cells than in healthy cells.

=== Alternative uses for partitioning ===
Using the dynamic partitioning capabilities employed in dPCR, improved NGS sequencing can be achieved by partitioning of complex PCR reactions prior to amplification to give more uniform amplification across many distinct amplicons for NGS analysis. Additionally, the improved specificity of complex PCR amplification reactions in droplets has been shown to greatly reduce the number of iterations required to select for high affinity aptamers in the SELEX method. Partitioning can also allow for more robust measurements of telomerase activity from cell lysates. dPCR's dynamic partitioning capabilities can also be used to partition thousands of nuclei or whole cells into individual droplets to facilitate library preparation for a single cell assay for transposase-accessible chromatin using sequencing (scATAC-seq).

=== Droplet digital PCR ===
Droplet digital PCR (ddPCR) is a method of dPCR in which a 20-microliter sample reaction including assay primers and either Taqman probes or an intercalating dye, is divided into ~20,000 nanoliter-sized oil droplets through a water-oil emulsion technique, thermocycled to endpoint in a 96-well PCR plate, and fluorescence amplitude read for all droplets in each sample well in a droplet flow cytometer. Gene copy numbers from ddPCR assays have been used to estimate the infection intensity of diseases.

=== Chip-based digital PCR ===
Chip-based Digital PCR (dPCR) is also a method of dPCR in which the reaction mix (also when used in qPCR) is divided into ~10,000 to ~45,000 partitions on a chip, then amplified using an endpoint PCR thermocycling machine, and is read using a high-powered camera reader with fluorescence filter (HEX, FAM, Cy5, Cy5.5 and Texas Red) for all partitions on each chip.

== History ==
dPCR rose out of an approach first published in 1988 by Cetus Corporation when researchers showed that a single copy of the β-globin gene could be detected and amplified by PCR. This was achieved by diluting DNA samples from a normal human cell line with DNA from a mutant line having a homozygous deletion of the β-globin gene, until it was no longer present in the reaction. In 1989, Peter Simmonds, AJ Brown et al. used this concept to quantify a molecule for the first time. Alex Morley and Pamela Sykes formally established the method as a quantitative technique in 1992.

In 1999, Bert Vogelstein and Kenneth Kinzler coined the term "digital PCR" and showed that the technique could be used to find rare cancer mutations. However, dPCR was difficult to perform; it was labor-intensive, required a lot of training to do properly, and was difficult to do in large quantities. In 2003, Kinzler and Vogelstein continued to refine dPCR and created an improved method that they called BEAMing technology, an acronym for "beads, emulsion, amplification and magnetics." The new protocol used emulsion to compartmentalize amplification reactions in a single tube. This change made it possible for scientists to scale the method to thousands of reactions in a single run. In 2007 Mikael Kubista, Stephen Bustin and coworkers published the first dPCR study using the first nanoliter platform, with a greater number of partitions, developed by Fluidigm, studying intracellular mRNA distribution.

Companies developing commercial dPCR systems have integrated technologies like automated partitioning of samples, digital counting of nucleic acid targets, and increasing droplet count that can help the process be more efficient. In recent years, scientists have developed and commercialized dPCR-based diagnostics for several conditions, including non-small cell lung cancer and Down's Syndrome. The first dPCR system for clinical use was CE-marked in 2017 and cleared by the US Food and Drug Administration in 2019, for diagnosing chronic myeloid leukemia.
