= CAPP-Seq =

DNA sequencing method

Cancer personalized profiling by deep sequencing
- Acronym: CAPP-Seq
- Uses: Quantification of low level ctDNA from cancer patients
- Notable experiments: CAPP-Seq was applied on non-small-cell lung cancer (NSCLC) to identify recurrent somatic alterations from ctDNA
- Related items: Cell-free tumor DNA

CAPP-Seq (cancer personalized profiling by deep sequencing) is a next-generation sequencing based method used to quantify circulating DNA in cancer (ctDNA). The method was introduced in 2014 by Ash Alizadeh and Maximilian Diehn’s laboratories at Stanford, as a tool for measuring Cell-free tumor DNA which is released from dead tumor cells into the blood and thus may reflect the entire tumor genome. This method can be generalized for any cancer type that is known to have recurrent mutations. CAPP-Seq can detect one molecule of mutant DNA in 10,000 molecules of healthy DNA. The original method was further refined in 2016 for ultra sensitive detection through integration of multiple error suppression strategies, termed integrated Digital Error Suppression (iDES). The use of ctDNA in this technique should not be confused with circulating tumor cells (CTCs); these are two different entities.

Originally described as a method to detect and monitor lung cancers, CAPP-Seq has been successfully adapted for a broad range of cancers by multiple independent groups. These include diffuse large B-cell lymphoma (DLBCL), follicular lymphoma (FL), post-transplant lymphoproliferative disorder (PTLD), metastatic colorectal cancer to ovary, esophageal cancer, pancreatic cancer, bladder cancer, leiomyosarcoma, diverse adult and pediatric sarcomas, among others.

== Method ==
Figure 01: An overview of the workflow of CAPP-Seq.

Population analysis is performed to identify recurrent mutations in a given cancer type. This is done by analyzing public data sets such as the COSMIC cancer database and TCGA. A ‘selector’ is designed which consists of biotinylated DNA oligonucleotide probes targeting the recurrently mutated regions chosen for the specific cancer type. The selector is chosen using a multiphase bioinformatics approach. Using the selector, a probe-based hybridization capture is performed on tumor and normal DNA to discover mutations specific to the patient. The hybridization capture is then also applied to ctDNA to quantify the mutations that were previously discovered.

=== ctDNA Extraction and Library Preparation ===
Peripheral blood is collected from patients and ctDNA is isolated from ≥1 mL of plasma. Input DNA can be as low as 4 ng.

There were four main goals in adapting this protocol for ctDNA work:

- 1) to optimize the adapter ligation efficiency
- 2) to reduce the number of PCR cycles needed after ligation
- 3) to preserve the naturally occurring size distribution of ctDNA (median 170 base pairs)
- 4) to minimize the variability in depth of sequence coverage across all the captured regions

These were achieved by allowing adaptor ligation to be carried out at 16°C for 16 hours to increase adaptor ligation efficiency and recovery. The most important adaptation is during enzymatic and clean-up steps; they are performed with-bead, in order to minimize tube transfer steps which increases recovery.

=== Selector design ===
In CAPP-Seq, design of selector is a crucial step that identifies recurrent mutations in a particular cancer type using publicly available next generation sequencing data. For inclusion in CAPP-seq selector, the recurrent mutations that are enriched in a population is described by an index- Recurrence Index (RI). RI is the number of mutations per kilobase of a given genomic locus of a patient carrying particular mutations. RI represents a patient level recurrence frequency estimated for somatic mutations and all mutations. Known and driver recurrent mutations in a population can be ranked based on the RI and therefore RI is used to design a selector. A six phase design strategy is employed to design selector.

- Phase-1: Identifying frequently mutated known driver mutations using the publicly available data.
- Phase-2: Maximum coverage of SNVs among the patients was identified by ranking their exonic RI.
- Phase-3 and 4: Exons with higher RI were selected.
- Phase-5: Addition of previously predicted driver mutations.
- Phase-6: Addition of recurrent gene fusions rearrangement that are specific for particular cancer.

Human cancer is heterogeneous and recurrent cancer mutations are present only a minority of patient. Therefore, a careful and non-redundant design of selector is the vital part in CAPP-Seq and also the size of the selector is related to its downstream costs.

Figure 02: Hybridization capture protocol used in CAPP-Seq.

=== Hybridization capture and sequencing ===
Hybridization capture with the selector probe set is performed on tumor DNA from a biopsy and sequenced to a depth of ~10,000× coverage. The biotinylated selector probes bind selectively to the regions of the DNA library that were chosen to be where the recurrently mutations occur in the given cancer type. In this way you are left with a smaller library that is enriched for only the regions you want, which can then be sequenced. This allows the determination of patient specific mutations. Hybridization capture with the same selector is then performed on ctDNA from the blood to quantify the previously identified mutations in the patient. CAPP-Seq can be applied to ctDNA from multiple blood samples at different time points in order to follow tumor evolution.

== Computational pipeline for CAPP-seq ==
A series of steps are involved in analysis of CAPP-Seq data from mutation detection to validation and open source software can do most of the analysis. After the first step of variant calling, germline and loss of heterozygosity (LOH) mutations are removed in CAPP-seq to reduce the background biases. Several statistical significance tests can be performed against background to all type of variant calling. For example, statistical significance of tumor-derived SNVs can be estimated by random sampling of background alleles using Monte Carlo method. For the indel calls, statistical significance is calculated applying a separate method that used a strand specific analysis by Z-test shown in previous work. Finally, a computational validation steps reduces the false positive calls. However, a robust computational framework specific for CAPP-seq data analysis is a high demand in this field.

== Sensitivity ==
Sensitivity of this technology depends on the effective design of selector and highly biased with the size of the cohort and type of cancer under study. The lack of background to find the statistically significant recurrent variants has limited its performance due to stochastic noise and biological variability. Receiver operating characteristic (ROC) analysis on several cancer patient and cancer cured patient (sample collected at different tumor stages, circulating DNA time point, treatment, etc.) showed that CAPP-seq has higher sensitivity and specificity compared to previous methods in non–small-cell lung cancer.

== Limitations ==
The detection limit of CAPP-Seq is affected by three main areas: the input amount of ctDNA molecules, sample cross-contamination, potential allelic bias in the capture reagent, and PCR or sequencing errors. ctDNA is able to be detected at a lower limit of 0.025% fractional abundance in the blood. Sample cross-contamination was found to be a very small contribution and reports have shown minimal allelic bias towards capture of reference alleles in peripheral blood lymphocytes (PBLs). PCR and sequencing errors are also minimal. The technique becomes questionable when ctDNA is present at low levels of 0.01%. Also, when there is less discharge of ctDNA due to stability of tumor growth by therapy, the detection is compromised.

Whether ctDNA is released at equal or unequal rate from primary tumors and metastatic diseases is still unknown. This fact should be taken into consideration while performing CAPP-Seq as it can cause problems in determining tumor burden and clonal evolution if different tumors or clones are dying off and releasing their DNA at different rates. It is also unknown how tumor histology affects ctDNA release.

Another major limitation with using only ctDNA levels to detect tumor burden is that ctDNA can only predict residual tumor, it can tell nothing about the location of the tumor. This means that CAPP-Seq can be best used in complementary with other sequencing approaches for imaging disease burden at different times. Thus, technical sensitivity, reproducibility, specificity and requirement of expertise for analysis of large amount of data are some of the concerned issues with the technique.

== Advantages ==
CAPP-Seq has many advantages over other methods such as digital polymerase chain reaction (dPCR) and amplicon sequencing. CAPP-Seq can survey many loci in the same experiment compared to dPCR and amplicon sequencing which use multiple different experiments and therefore use up much more sample. Another advantage is that CAPP-Seq can not only detect point mutations but it can also detect indels, structural variations, and copy number variations and also aids in monitoring minimal residual disease.

Another advantage of CAPP-Seq is that because it only targets specific areas of interest in the genome it is more cost effective than whole exome sequencing and whole genome sequencing which are 171X and 44X more expensive respectively. Also, there is no need of discrete streamlining for individual patients.

Using circulating tumor DNA as opposed to solid tumor biopsies allows analysis of the full repertoire of tumor cells dispersed throughout the tumor and distant metastasis. Therefore, there is a better chance of finding all mutations associated with this cancer. Having a full overview of the cancer and what is driving it will allow for better treatment plans and management of disease.

== Applications ==
=== Monitoring tumor burden ===
When treating cancer it is useful to have precise measurements of the total body disease burden. It helps with determining prognostic significance and treatment response. This is normally done using computed tomography (CT scans), positron emission tomography (PET scans), or magnetic resonance imaging (MRI). These medical imaging procedures are expensive and are not without their own problems. These imaging techniques are not able to accurately resolve small tumors (≤1 cm in diameter). Imaging can also be affected by radiation-induced inflammation and fibrotic changes, making it hard to determine if there is residual tumor or just effects of treatment.

It has been found that levels of ctDNA in plasma significantly correlate with tumor volume as compared with medical imaging (CT, PET and MRI)., Detection of ctDNA can predict residual tumor or imminent relapse, in some cases even better than medical imaging and current methods.

=== Prognostic indicator ===
Detection of ctDNA has been found to be a predictor of relapse in multiple studies thus far. In a study in late-stage non-small-cell lung cancer (NSCLC) they found two cases where ctDNA correctly determined the outcome of a patient when medical imaging was wrong. In one case, the imaging predicted relapse based on a suspected residual tumor which turned out to only be radiation-induced inflammation, but ctDNA was not detected and the patient did not relapse. In another case, the imaging showed no tumor but ctDNA was detected and the patient relapsed shortly afterward. In another study on diffuse large B-cell lymphoma (DLBCL), ctDNA was also found to be predictive of relapse.

=== Biopsy-free tumor genotyping ===
Biopsies are invasive and associated with risks to the patient. Therefore, multiple biopsies to monitor disease progression are rare and diagnostic biopsies are relied on for genetic information. This can be problematic because of tumor heterogeneity and tumor evolution. Firstly, biopsies only sample one portion of the tumor, and because tumors are heterogeneous, this will not cover the full genetic landscape of the tumor. Secondly, after treatment tumors evolve and there may be new mutations not represented in the diagnostic sample.

Biopsy-free tumor genotyping, by way of CAPP-Seq and ctDNA, addresses many of these issues. A simple blood test is non-invasive and much safer and easier to subject cancer patients to multiple times through the course of treatment. Using ctDNA gives a better sample of tumor DNA compared to a single area of a tumor collected in a biopsy, allowing a better estimate of tumor heterogeneity. Taking multiple samples of ctDNA at different time points following the course of treatment allows tumor evolution to be uncovered. This can help detect the emergence of mutations that confer resistance to a targeted therapy and allow the course of treatment to be adjusted accordingly. CAPP-Seq specifically allows for the screening of multiple genomic locations which will become important as the list of cancer mutations important for treatment continues to grow. In a study for late stage NSCLC, they performed a version of CAPP-Seq where the tumor biopsy was not sequenced first, and they were able to correctly classify 100% of patient plasma samples with a 0% false positive rate. This shows that even without previous knowledge of tumor mutations, they can be accurately discovered by ctDNA alone.
