= Schema-agnostic databases =

Schema-agnostic databases or vocabulary-independent databases aim at supporting users to be abstracted from the representation of the data, supporting the automatic semantic matching between queries and databases. Schema-agnosticism is the property of a database of mapping a query issued with the user terminology and structure, automatically mapping it to the dataset vocabulary.

The increase in the size and in the semantic heterogeneity of database schemas bring new requirements for users querying and searching structured data. At this scale it can become unfeasible for data consumers to be familiar with the representation of the data in order to query it. At the center of this discussion is the semantic gap between users and databases, which becomes more central as the scale and complexity of the data grows.

== Description ==
The evolution of data environments towards the consumption of data from multiple data sources and the growth in the schema size, complexity, dynamicity and decentralisation (SCoDD) of schemas increases the complexity of contemporary data management. The SCoDD trend emerges as a central data management concern in Big Data scenarios, where users and applications have a demand for more complete data, produced by independent data sources, under different semantic assumptions and contexts of use, which is the typical scenario for Semantic Web Data applications.

The evolution of databases in the direction of heterogeneous data environments strongly impacts the usability, semiotics and semantic assumptions behind existing data accessibility methods such as structured queries, keyword-based search and visual query systems. With schema-less databases containing potentially millions of dynamically changing attributes, it becomes unfeasible for some users to become aware of the 'schema' or vocabulary in order to query the database. At this scale, the effort in understanding the schema in order to build a structured query can become prohibitive.

== Schema-agnostic queries ==
Schema-agnostic queries can be defined as query approaches over structured databases which allow users satisfying complex information needs without the understanding of the representation (schema) of the database. Similarly, Tran et al. defines it as "search approaches, which do not require users to know the schema underlying the data". Approaches such as keyword-based search over databases allow users to query databases without employing structured queries. However, as discussed by Tran et al.: "From these points, users however have to do further navigation and exploration to address complex information needs. Unlike keyword search used on the Web, which focuses on simple needs, the keyword search elaborated here is used to obtain more complex results. Instead of a single set of resources, the goal is to compute complex sets of resources and their relations."

The development of approaches to support natural language interfaces (NLI) over databases have aimed towards the goal of schema-agnostic queries. Complementarily, some approaches based on keyword search have targeted keyword-based queries which express more complex information needs. Other approaches have explored the construction of structured queries over databases where schema constraints can be relaxed. All these approaches (natural language, keyword-based search and structured queries) have targeted different degrees of sophistication in addressing the problem of supporting a flexible semantic matching between queries and data, which vary from the completely absence of the semantic concern to more principled semantic models. While the demand for schema-agnosticism has been an implicit requirement across semantic search and natural language query systems over structured data, it is not sufficiently individuated as a concept and as a necessary requirement for contemporary database management systems. Recent works have started to define and model the semantic aspects involved on schema-agnostic queries.

=== Schema-agnostic structured queries ===
Consist of schema-agnostic queries following the syntax of a structured standard (for example SQL, SPARQL). The syntax and semantics of operators are maintained, while different terminologies are used.

==== Example 1 ====
SELECT ?y {
  BillClinton hasDaughter ?x .
  ?x marriedTo ?y .
}

which maps to the following SPARQL query in the dataset vocabulary:

PREFIX : <http://dbpedia.org/resource/>
PREFIX dbpedia2: <http://dbpedia.org/property/>
PREFIX dbpedia: <http://dbpedia.org/ontology/>
PREFIX skos: <http://www.w3.org/2004/02/skos/core#>
PREFIX dbo: <http://dbpedia.org/ontology/>

SELECT   ?y  {
 :Bill_Clinton dbpedia:child ?x .
 ?x dbpedia2:spouse ?y .
 }

==== Example 2 ====
SELECT   ?x {
         ?x isA book .
         ?x by William_Goldman .
         ?x has_pages ?p .
         FILTER (?p > 300)
  }

which maps to the following SPARQL query in the dataset vocabulary:

PREFIX rdf: <http://www.w3.org/1999/02/22-rdf-syntax-ns#>
PREFIX : <http://dbpedia.org/resource/>
PREFIX dbpedia2: <http://dbpedia.org/property/>
PREFIX dbpedia: <http://dbpedia.org/ontology/>
SELECT ?x {
         ?x rdf:type dbpedia:Book .
         ?x dbpedia2:author :William_Goldman . 
         ?x dbpedia:numberOfPages ?p .
FILTER(?p > 300)
}

=== Schema-agnostic keyword queries ===
Consist of schema-agnostic queries using keyword queries. In this case the syntax and semantics of operators are different from the structured query syntax.

==== Example ====
"Bill Clinton daughter married to"

"Books by William Goldman with more than 300 pages"

== Semantic complexity ==
As of 2016 the concept of schema-agnostic queries has been developed primarily in academia. Most of schema-agnostic query systems have been investigated in the context of Natural Language Interfaces over databases or over the Semantic Web. These works explore the application of semantic parsing techniques over large, heterogeneous and schema-less databases. More recently, the individuation of the concept of schema-agnostic query systems and databases have appeared more explicitly within the literature. Freitas et al. provide a probabilistic model on the semantic complexity of mapping schema-agnostic queries.
