= CIBERSORT =

Bioinformatics tool

CIBERSORT, and its successor called CIBERSORTx, are a set of bioinformatics tools used to deconvolute cell type proportions and gene expression profiles from bulk RNA sequencing datasets. It is among the fastest growing software tools in the life sciences. The technology is licensed to CiberMed, Inc. as iSort Fractions and iSort HiRes for biotechnology industry use.
