= Master mix (PCR) =

Mixture used in molecular biology

A master mix is a mixture containing precursors and enzymes used as an ingredient in polymerase chain reaction techniques in molecular biology. Such mixtures contain a mixture dNTPs (required as a substrate for the building of new DNA strands), MgCl_{2}, Taq polymerase (an enzyme required to building new DNA strands), a pH buffer and come mixed in nuclease-free water.

Master mixes for real-time PCR include a fluorescent compound (frequently SYBR green), and the choice of mix also influence test sensitivity and consistency.

Differences in the choice of master mixes can sometimes explain difference in experimental results, a particular case being the measurement of telomere length.
