= PPM1D =

Protein-coding gene in the species Homo sapiens

Identifiers
- Aliases: PPM1D, PP2C-DELTA, WIP1, protein phosphatase, Mg2+/Mn2+ dependent 1D, IDDGIP, JDVS, WIP1 protein, human, PPM1D protein, human
- External IDs: OMIM: 605100; MGI: 1858214; GeneCards: PPM1D
Enzyme activity
EC #	BRENDA	ExPASy	KEGG	MetaCyc
3.1.3.16	↗	↗	↗	↗

Gene location (Human)
Chr.	Chromosome 17 (human)
Band	17q23.2	Start	60,600,193 bp
Band	17q23.2	End	60,666,280 bp

Gene location (Mouse)
Chr.	Chromosome 11 (mouse)
Band	11 C|11 51.34 cM	Start	85,202,070 bp
Band	11 C|11 51.34 cM	End	85,237,892 bp
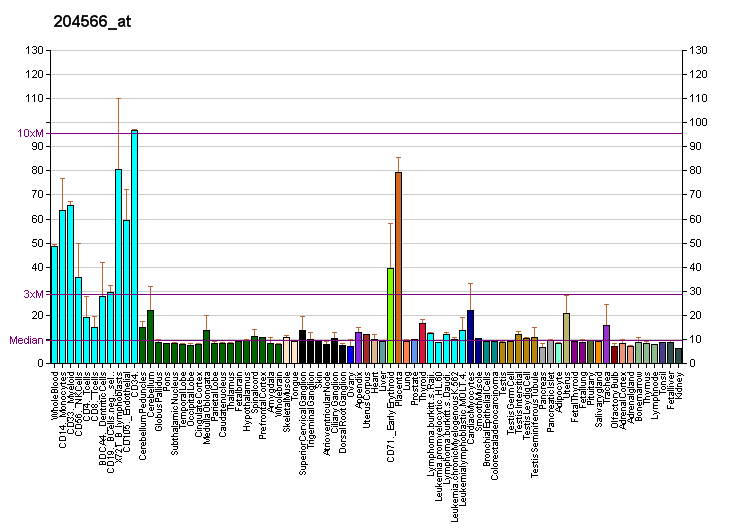
RNA expression pattern
Bgee	Human / Mouse (ortholog); Top expressed in: secondary oocyte; amniotic fluid; ventricular zone; gonad; placenta; ganglionic eminence; mucosa of sigmoid colon; jejunal mucosa; germinal epithelium; Achilles tendon / Top expressed in: seminiferous tubule; spermatid; genital tubercle; fetal liver hematopoietic progenitor cell; tail of embryo; spermatocyte; zygote; lobe of cerebellum; medial ganglionic eminence; cerebellar vermis; More reference expression data
BioGPS	More reference expression data
Gene ontology
Molecular function	protein serine/threonine phosphatase activity; protein binding; catalytic activity; phosphoprotein phosphatase activity; hydrolase activity; metal ion binding; cation binding; mitogen-activated protein kinase binding; protein serine/threonine kinase activity
Cellular component	nucleoplasm; nucleus; cytoplasm; cytosol
Biological process	cellular response to starvation; cell cycle; response to radiation; protein dephosphorylation; G2/M transition of mitotic cell cycle; response to bacterium; peptidyl-threonine dephosphorylation; negative regulation of cell population proliferation; DNA methylation; transcription initiation from RNA polymerase II promoter; protein phosphorylation; negative regulation of gene expression, epigenetic; DNA damage response, signal transduction by p53 class mediator
Sources:Amigo / QuickGO
Orthologs
Databases	NCBI: entry; OMA: entry
Species	Human	Mouse
Entrez	8493	53892
Ensembl	ENSG00000170836	ENSMUSG00000020525
UniProt	O15297	Q9QZ67
RefSeq (mRNA)	NM_003620	NM_016910
RefSeq (protein)	NP_003611	NP_058606
Location (UCSC)	Chr 17: 60.6 – 60.67 Mb	Chr 11: 85.2 – 85.24 Mb
PubMed search
- Wikidata
View/Edit Human	View/Edit Mouse

Protein phosphatase 1D is an enzyme that in humans is encoded by the PPM1D gene.

== Gene ==
The protein encoded by this gene is a member of the PP2C family of Ser/Thr protein phosphatases.

== Function ==
PP2C family members are known to be negative regulators of cell stress response pathways. The expression of this gene is induced in a p53-dependent manner in response to various environmental stresses. While being induced by tumor suppressor protein TP53/p53, this phosphatase negatively regulates the activity of p38 MAP kinase (MAPK/p38) through which it reduces the phosphorylation of p53, and in turn suppresses p53-mediated transcription and apoptosis. This phosphatase thus mediates a feedback regulation of p38-p53 signaling that contributes to growth inhibition and the suppression of stress induced apoptosis.

== Clinical significance ==
This gene is located in a chromosomal region known to be amplified in breast cancer. The amplification of this gene has been detected in both breast cancer cell line and primary breast tumors, which suggests a role of this gene in cancer development. Pathogenic variants in exons 5-6 in the PPM1D gene can cause the neurodevelopmental disorder known as Jansen-de Vries Syndrome (JdVS).

== Interactions ==
PPM1D has been shown to interact with CDC5L.
