= Minimal residual disease =

Persistence of some cancer cells during remission

Minimal residual disease (MRD), also known as molecular residual disease, or measurable residual disease, is the medical condition in which small number of cancer cells persist in a patient either during or after treatment when the patient is in remission and that cannot be detected with current medical imaging or routine screening options (occult stage of cancer progression).

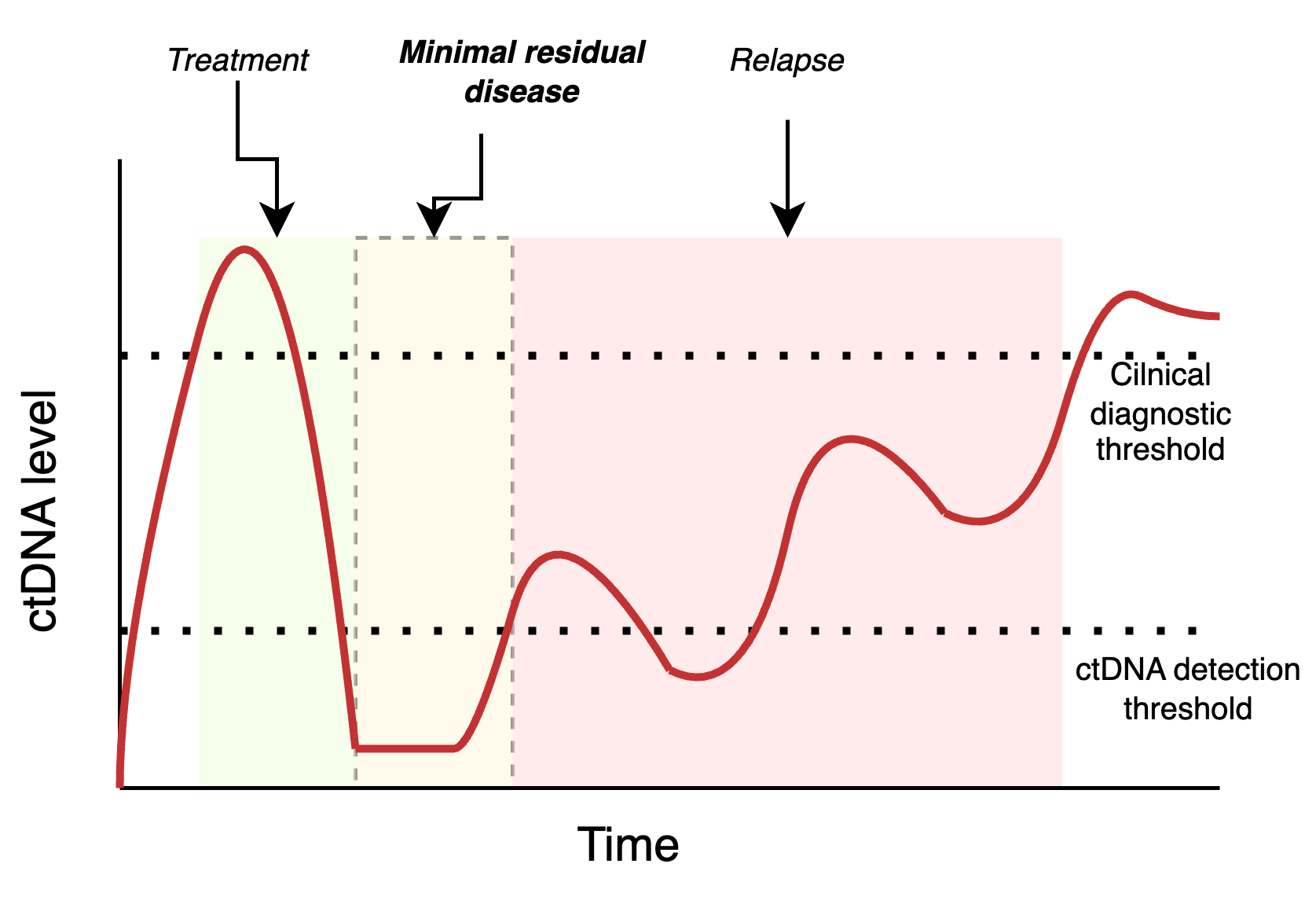
Schematic of ctDNA level showing minimal residual disease post-treatment resulting in eventual relapse of the disease.

MRD detection is strongly associated with cancer recurrence, often with a lead time of several months relative to other forms of clinical evidence. The presence and quantity of MRD are significant because these residual cells can potentially multiply and cause the cancer to relapse, and therefore detecting MRD has significant clinical and diagnostic potential.

Sensitive molecular tests, typically minimally invasive and done through a liquid biopsy, are either in development or available to test for MRD. These can measure minute levels of cancer cells in tissue samples, sometimes as low as one cancer cell in a million normal cells, either using DNA, RNA or proteins. Monitoring is performed every three to six months. MRD assessment is increasingly used, particularly in hematological malignancies like leukemia and multiple myeloma, as a powerful prognostic marker and to help guide treatment decisions. MRD monitoring may also be performed as part of research or clinical trials.

== Background ==
MRD was originally described in hematological cancers such as adult acute myeloid leukemia. Subsequently, MRD research has broadened out to other hematological malignancies such as multiple myeloma, as well as to solid tumors.

In leukemia, a genetic abnormality in a single cell can cause it to then multiply rapidly, leading to a proliferation of specific cell types in the blood, and symptoms may not occur until the disease is advanced. While initial treatment with for example BCL2-inhibitors, FLT3-inhibitors, or IDH1/2-inhibitors, may kill leukemic cells, pre-leukemic clones may survive treatment and persist at frequencies of less than 0.1% in the bone marrow for months or years. This minimal residual disease can be identified by sensitive molecular tests such as DNA sequencing, but not by other methods such as viewing cells under a microscope. Hence the alternative name, molecular residual disease.

== Clinical significance ==
In cancer treatment, MRD testing has several important roles:

- determining whether treatment has eradicated the cancer or whether traces remain
- monitoring patient remission status as well as detecting recurrence of cancer
- comparing the efficacy of different treatments
- helping patients and doctors make decisions about treatment regimen (start, stop or change)

== Detection ==
=== DNA-based tests ===
DNA tests are based on detecting circulating tumor DNA in the blood that contains cancer-specific DNA sequences. Modern techniques use next-generation sequencing to detect MRD. The detection method may be "tumor-informed", using mutation information from sequencing an individual's tumor tissue biopsy samples before subsequent MRD monitoring. Or they may be "tumor-agnostic", also known as "tumor-naive" or "tumor-uninformed", using a fixed panel of known cancer driver mutations. The tumor-agnostic approach is chosen when mutation information from an individual's primary tumor tissue is not available.

The tumor-informed approach is a form of personalized medicine. Typically tens or hundreds of mutations are chosen for MRD monitoring, and these tests can have a limit of detection of 0.001%, or one cell in 100,000. The DNA sequences chosen in this approach may contribute to the genesis of the cancer, or may simply be linked to it (i.e. a mutation that is carried by cancer cells, but is not a driver of carcinogenesis).

The markers used for DNA-based testing can be single nucleotide polymorphisms or chromosomal translocations. In the case of leukemia, this may be t(14;18) involving BCL2 and t(11;14) involving BCL1 (CCND1). Other methods for MRD detection include microsatellites, immunoglobulin and T cell receptors.

=== RNA-based tests ===
These are based on detecting a cancer-specific RNA sequence. Generally, this is achieved through the use of reverse transcription of the RNA followed by polymerase chain reaction. RNA-based tests are normally utilized when a DNA test is impractical. For example, the t(9;22) BCR-ABL translocation may occur over a large length of the chromosome which makes DNA-based testing difficult and inefficient. However, RNA is a much less stable target for diagnostics than DNA and requires careful handling and processing.

The markers used for RNA-based testing are almost exclusively chromosomal translocations such as t(9;22) BCR-ABL, t(15;17) PML-RARA and t(12;21) ETV6-RUNX1 (TEL-AML1).

=== Patient-specific testing ===
Patient-specific MRD detection using immunoglobulin (IG) or T-cell receptors (TCR) is gaining popularity as a way of measuring MRD in leukemias that do not contain a chromosomal translocation or other leukemic specific marker. In this case, the leukemic-specific IG or TCR clone is amplified using PCR and the variable region of the IG or TCR is sequenced. From this sequence, PCR primers are designed that will only amplify the specific leukemic clone from the patient.

Both the DNA- and RNA-based tests require that a pathologist examine the bone marrow to determine which leukemic specific sequence to target. Once the target is determined, a sample of blood or bone marrow is obtained, nucleic acid is extracted, and the sample analyzed for the leukemic sequence. These tests are very specific and detect leukemic cells at levels down to one cell in a million, though the limit typically achieved is one in 10,000 to one in 100,000 cells. For comparison, the limit of what one can detect using traditional morphologic examinations using a microscope is about one cell in 100.

=== Immunological tests ===
Immunological-based testing of leukemias utilizes proteins on the surface of the cells. White blood cells (WBC) can show a variety of proteins on the surface depending upon the type of WBC. Leukemic cells often show quite unusual and unique combinations (leukemic phenotype) of these cell surface proteins. These proteins can be stained with fluorescent dye labeled antibodies and detected using flow cytometry. The limit of detection of immunological tests is generally about one in 10,000 cells and cannot be used on leukemias that don't have an identifiable and stable leukemic phenotype.

== Common biomarkers ==
=== Acute lymphoblastic leukaemia (ALL) ===
Targets: t(9;22) BCR-ABL, t(12;21) ETV6-RUNX1 (TEL-AML1), Patient specific assays for immunoglobulin and T cell receptor genes

Uses: Chromosomal translocation MRD detection is widely used as a standard clinical practice. Patient specific assays are gaining acceptance but are still generally only used in research protocols.

=== Acute myeloid leukaemia (AML) ===
Targets: t(15;17) PML-RARA, t(8;21) AML1-RUNX1T1 (AML-ETO), inv(16), BCL2, FLT3, IDH1/2, NPM1.

Uses: Chromosomal translocation MRD detection widely used as a standard clinical practice.

=== Chronic lymphocytic leukaemia ===
Targets: Cell surface proteins, patient-specific assays for immunoglobulin and T cell receptor genes

Uses: Immunological methods are gaining wider use as more advanced flow cytometers are utilized for clinical testing. Patient specific assays are still generally only used in research protocols.

=== Chronic myelogenous leukemia ===
Target: t(9;22) BCR-ABL

Uses: MRD detection of the t(9;22) is considered standard of care for all patients with CML and is extremely valuable for patients being treated with imatinib mesylate (Gleevec/Glivec).

=== Follicular lymphoma ===
Targets: t(14;18) IgH/BCL2, Patient specific assays for immunoglobulin and T cell receptor genes.

Uses: The t(14;18) is regularly used for MRD detection. Patient specific assays are still generally only used in research protocols.

=== Mantle cell lymphoma ===
Targets: t(11;14) IgH/CCND1 (IgH/BCL1), patient-specific assays for immunoglobulin and T cell receptor genes

Uses: The t(11;14) is regularly used for MRD detection, but the assay can only reliably detect 40–60% of the t(11;14) translocations. Patient-specific assays are still generally only used in research protocols.

=== Multiple myeloma ===
Targets: M-protein levels in blood, patient-specific assays for immunoglobulin and T cell receptor genes (high levels of somatic hypermutation often prevent this assay from reliably working).

Uses: M-protein level in the blood is standard of care and is used for almost all patients with multiple myeloma. Patient-specific assays are still generally only used in research protocols. In 2024, the FDA approved MRD as an early endpoint in clinical trials, which speeds up development of new myeloma therapies.

=== Solid tumors ===
Research into MRD detection of several solid tumors such as Breast, Colorectal, Non-Small Cell Lung Cancer (NSCLC), Prostate, Melanoma, Bladder, and Pancreatic cancer.

New research uses Whole genome sequencing and Artificial Intelligence to find MRD across multiple solid tumors.

=== Animal species other than humans ===
Cancer could potentially be monitored similarly in non-human animals, however, no known evidence of such veterinary applications exists to date.

== Clinical significance ==
=== Level of MRD is a guide to prognosis or relapse risk ===
In some cases, the level of MRD at a certain time in treatment is a useful guide to the patient's prognosis. For instance, in childhood leukaemia, doctors traditionally take a bone marrow sample after five weeks, and assess the level of leukaemia in that. Even with a microscope, they were able to identify a few patients whose disease had not cleared, and those patients received different treatment. MRD tests also make use of this time, but the tests are much more sensitive.

When past patients were studied, patients with high levels at this stage – here "high" means often leukaemia more than 1 cell in 1000 – were at risk of relapse. Patients with levels below 1 in 100,000 were very unlikely to relapse. For those in between, some relapsed. This led to the idea that MRD testing could predict outcome, and this has now been shown. The next step is whether, having identified a patient whom standard treatment leaves at high risk, there are different treatments they could be offered, to lower that risk. Several clinical trials are investigating this.

Other research groups have looked at other times in treatment - e.g. 3 months, 6 months, one year, or end of current treatment (two years) and these can predict outcome also.

There are also a few scientific studies, showing that level of MRD after bone marrow transplant, shows the risk of relapsing.

=== Monitoring people for early signs of recurring leukaemia ===
Another possible use is to identify if or when someone starts to relapse, early, before symptoms come back. This would mean regular blood or marrow samples. This is being explored mainly in chronic myeloid leukaemia (CML), where one can study the leukaemia in blood, which is easier to sample regularly than bone marrow. The molecular tests can show tumour levels starting to rise, very early, possibly months before symptoms recur. Starting treatment early might be useful: the patient will be healthier; fewer leukaemic cells to deal with; the cells may be amenable to treatment, since at clinical relapse they have often become more resistant to drugs used.

=== Individualization of treatment ===
This whole area comes under individualization of treatment, or if one prefers, identification of risk factors. Currently, most patient receive the same treatment, but leukemia is a very variable disease, and different patients probably have widely different treatment needs, to eradicate the disease.

For instance, the initial five-week induction treatment might rapidly clear disease for some patients. For others, the same treatment might leave significant amounts of disease. Measuring MRD level helps doctors decide which patients need what. In other words, it identifies patients' individual risks of relapse and can theoretically allow them to receive just enough treatment to prevent it.

Without information on minimal residual disease (MRD), treatment decisions may rely more heavily on standard clinical criteria. This can result in some patients receiving insufficient treatment while others may receive more treatment than necessary. The identification of prognostic and risk factors is therefore used to help stratify patients and guide more individualized treatment approaches.

== Role in treatment ==
Generally, the approach is to bring a cancer into remission first (absence of symptoms) and then try to eradicate the remaining cells (MRD). Often the treatments needed to eradicate MRD differ from those used initially. This is an area of much research.

It seems a sensible idea to aim to reduce or eradicate MRD. What is needed is evidence on which is the best method, and how well it works. This is emerging. Treatments which specifically target MRD can include:

- intensive conventional treatment with more drugs, or a different combination of drugs
- stem cell transplant, e.g. marrow transplant. This allows more intensive chemotherapy to be given, and in addition the transplanted bone marrow may help eradicate the minimal residual disease
- immunotherapy
- monitoring the patient carefully for early signs of relapse. This is an area of active research in several countries.
- treatment with monoclonal antibodies which target cancer cells
- cancer vaccines

== Current research and limitations ==
=== Clinical usefulness of MRD tests ===
It is important that doctors interpreting tests, base what they say on scientific evidence. If one visits hospital and gets tested for something - e.g. a blood count - most of the tests are used often and have been done thousands or millions of times before, on many different people. The doctors reading the test results have a large body of evidence to interpret what the results mean. By contrast, MRD tests are new, and the diseases are uncommon. The tests have been done on relatively few people. Consequently, there is less evidence available to guide doctors in interpreting the tests or basing treatment decisions on them. In plain English, this means the doctors are likely to be very cautious and rely more on other tests which they know and trust, than these, at least at present, while evidence is accumulating.

=== Method for testing, and when to test ===
There are controversies about the best times to test, and the best test method to use. There are national and international approaches to standardize these. In childhood leukemia and chronic myeloid leukemia, there appears to be consensus emerging.

=== Is there such a thing as a safe level of MRD ===
There is also controversy about whether MRD is always bad, inevitably causing relapse, or whether sometimes low levels are 'safe' and do not regrow. It is usually assumed that cancer cells inevitably grow and that if they are present disease usually develops. But there is some evidence from animal studies, that leukemic cells can lie dormant for years in the body and do not regrow. For this reason, it may be that the goal of treating MRD may be to reduce it to a "safe" level - not to eradicate it completely.

=== Is MRD testing useful for all patients? ===
Some types of leukemias are difficult to treat. In these, it is not clear how MRD testing would help. The patients may not do well on current treatment, but sometimes it is not clear what other treatment, if anything, might be better. There is thus an argument that as the test is not necessary: it might involve an additional procedure for the patient; it will contribute no useful information on treatment, it is not necessary.

== Testing by hospitals and other labs ==
=== Where done ===
Currently most MRD testing is done during clinical trials. The tests are specialized, so samples are usually sent to a central reference laboratory in each region or country. The tests are not done in most routine diagnostic labs, as they tend to be complex, and also would be used relatively infrequently.

=== Availability of testing ===
MRD testing is technically demanding and time-consuming; the tests are expensive, so are usually available only through specialist centers, as part of clinical trials.

=== Interpretation of test results ===
Unlike clinical tests which have been done millions of times and can be used to guide treatment, MRD tests are new and have been carried out on relatively few people (a few thousand at most). Researchers and doctors are still building the database of knowledge needed to show what MRD tests mean although this is likely to change in future as testing becomes more routine.
