= Circulating tumor DNA =

Tumor-derived fragmented DNA in the bloodstream

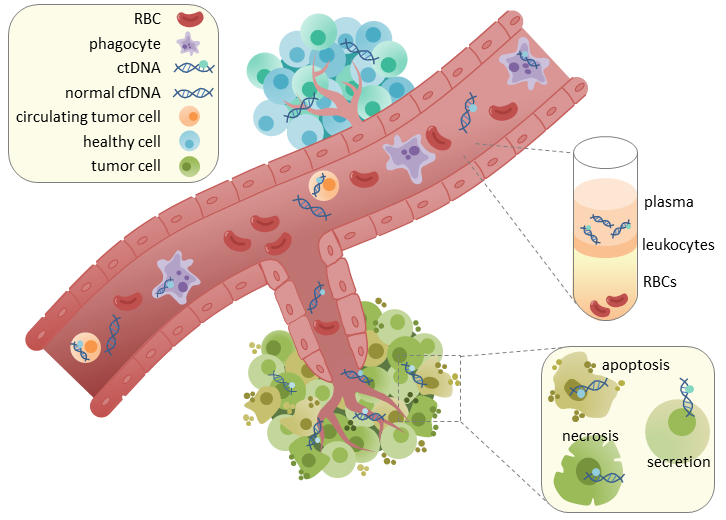
Circulating tumor DNA (ctDNA) is found in serum and plasma fractions from blood. The mechanism of ctDNA release is unknown, though apoptosis, necrosis, and active secretion from tumor cells have been hypothesized. Once ctDNA is isolated, it can be sequenced for mutational analysis.

Circulating tumor DNA (ctDNA) is tumor-derived fragmented DNA in the bloodstream that is not associated with cells. ctDNA should not be confused with cell-free DNA (cfDNA), a broader term which describes DNA that is freely circulating in the bloodstream, but is not necessarily of tumor origin. Because ctDNA may reflect the entire tumor genome, it has gained traction for its potential clinical utility; "liquid biopsies" in the form of blood draws may be taken at various time points to monitor tumor progression throughout the treatment regimen.

Recent studies have laid the foundation for inferring gene expression from cfDNA (and ctDNA), with EPIC-seq emerging as a notable advancement. This method has substantially raised the bar for the noninvasive inference of expression levels of individual genes, thereby augmenting the assay's applicability in disease characterization, histological classification, and monitoring treatment efficacy.

ctDNA originates directly from the tumor or from circulating tumor cells (CTCs), which describes viable, intact tumor cells that shed from primary tumors and enter the bloodstream or lymphatic system. The precise mechanism of ctDNA release is unclear. The biological processes postulated to be involved in ctDNA release include apoptosis and necrosis from dying cells, or active release from viable tumor cells. Studies in both human (healthy and cancer patients) and xenografted mice show that the size of fragmented cfDNA is predominantly 166bp long, which corresponds to the length of DNA wrapped around a nucleosome plus a linker. Fragmentation of this length might be indicative of apoptotic DNA fragmentation, suggesting that apoptosis may be the primary method of ctDNA release. The fragmentation of cfDNA is altered in the plasma of cancer patients. In healthy tissue, infiltrating phagocytes are responsible for clearance of apoptotic or necrotic cellular debris, which includes cfDNA. ctDNA in healthy patients is only present at low levels but higher levels of ctDNA in cancer patients can be detected with increasing tumor sizes. This possibly occurs due to inefficient immune cell infiltration to tumor sites, which reduces effective clearance of ctDNA from the bloodstream. Comparison of mutations in ctDNA and DNA extracted from primary tumors of the same patients revealed the presence of identical cancer-relevant genetic changes. This led to the possibility of using ctDNA for earlier cancer detection and treatment follow up.

== Methods ==
=== Pre-analytical considerations ===
When blood is collected in EDTA tubes and stored, the white blood cells begin to lyse and release genomic wild type DNA in to the sample in quantities typically many fold higher than the ctDNA is present in. This makes detection of mutations or other ctDNA biomarkers more difficult. The use of commercially available cell stabilisation tubes can prevent or delay the lysis of white cells thereby reducing the dilution effect of the ctDNA. Sherwood et al. demonstrated superior detection of KRAS mutations in matched samples collected in both EDTA K3 and Streck BCT tubes. The advantages of cell stabilisation tubes can be realised in situation where blood cannot be processed to plasma immediately.

Other procedures can also reduce the amount of "contaminating" wild type DNA and make detection of ctDNA more feasible:

- Never freeze a blood sample before extracting the plasma for ctDNA analysis
- Process the sample to plasma within 2–4 hours (if collected in EDTA tube)
- Never use heparinised tubes, heparin inhibits PCR by mimicking the helical structure of DNA
- Perform a double centrifugation step (centrifuge the blood to extract plasma, then repeat on the plasma to remove from debris in the bottom of the tube) to remove more cellular debris prior to DNA extraction.
- Plasma is better than serum for ctDNA recovery

=== Extraction of ctDNA ===
The main appeal of ctDNA analysis is that it is extracted in a minimally-invasive manner through blood collection. Acquisition of cfDNA or ctDNA typically requires collection of approximately 3mL of blood into EDTA-coated tubes. The use of EDTA is important to reduce coagulation of blood. The plasma fractions of blood can be separated through a centrifugation step. ctDNA or cfDNA can be subsequently extracted from these fractions. Although serum tends to have greater levels of cfDNA, this is primarily attributed to DNA from lymphocytes. High levels of contaminating cfDNA is sub-optimal because this can decrease the sensitivity of ctDNA detection. Therefore, the majority of studies use plasma for ctDNA isolation. Plasma is then processed again by centrifugation to remove residual intact blood cells. The supernatant is used for DNA extraction, which can be performed using commercially available kits.

=== Analysis of ctDNA ===
The analysis of ctDNA after extraction requires the use of various amplification and sequencing methods. These methods can be separated into two main groups based on whether the goal is to interrogate all genes in an untargeted approach, or if the goal is to monitor specific genes and mutations in a targeted approach.

==== Untargeted approaches ====
A whole genome or whole exome sequencing approaches may be necessary to discover new mutations in tumor DNA while monitoring disease burden or tracking drug resistance. Untargeted approaches are also useful in research to observe tumor heterogeneity or to discover new drug targets. However, while untargeted methods may be necessary in certain applications, it is more expensive and has lower resolution. This makes it difficult to detect rare mutations, or in situations where low ctDNA levels are present (such as minimal residual disease). Furthermore, there can be problems distinguishing between DNA from tumor cells and DNA from normal cells using a whole genome approach.

Whole genome or exome sequencing typically use high throughput DNA sequencing technologies. Limiting the sequencing to only the whole exome instead can decrease expense and increase speed, but at the cost of losing information about mutations in the non-coding regulatory regions of DNA. While simply looking at DNA polymorphisms through sequencing does not differentiate DNA from tumor or normal cells, this problem can be resolved by comparing against a control sample of normal DNA (for example, DNA obtained through a buccal swab.) Importantly, whole genome and whole exome sequencing are useful for initial mutation discovery. This provides information for the use of more sensitive targeted techniques, which can then be used for disease monitoring purposes.

Whole genome sequencing enables to recover the structural properties of cfDNA, the size of fragments and their fragmentation patterns. These unique patterns can be an important source of information to improve the detection of ctDNA or localize the tissue of origin of these fragments. Size-selection of short fragments (<150bp) with in vitro or in silico methods could improve the recovery of mutations and copy number aberrations.

===== Digital karyotyping =====
This method was originally developed by the laboratory of Bert Vogelstein, Luis Diaz, and Victor Velculescu at Johns Hopkins University. Unlike normal karyotyping where a dye is used to stain chromosomal bands in order to visualize the chromosomes, digital karyotyping uses DNA sequences of loci throughout the genome in order to calculate copy number variation. Copy number variations are common in cancers and describe situations where loss of heterozygosity of a gene may lead to decreased function due to lower expression, or duplication of a gene, which leads to overexpression.

===== Personalized analysis of rearranged ends =====
After the whole genome is sequenced using a high throughput sequencing method, such as Illumina HiSeq, personalized analysis of rearranged ends (PARE) is applied to the data to analyze chromosomal rearrangements and translocations. This technique was originally designed to analyze solid tumor DNA but was modified for ctDNA applications.

===== DNA methylation and hydroxymethylation =====
Proper epigenetic marking is essential for normal gene expression and cell function and aberrant alterations in epigenetic patterns is a hallmark of cancer. A normal epigenetic status is maintained in a cell at least in part through DNA methylation. Measuring aberrant methylation patterns in ctDNA is possible due to stable methylation of regions of DNA referred to as "CpG islands". Methylation of ctDNA can be detected through bisulfite treatment. Bisulfite treatment chemically converts unmethylated cytosines into a uracil while leaving methylated cytosines unmodified. DNA is subsequently sequenced, and any alterations to the DNA methylation pattern can be identified. DNA hydroxymethylation is a similarly associated mark that has been shown to be a predictive marker of healthy versus diseased conditions in cfDNA, including cancer.)

==== Targeted approaches ====
In a targeted approach, sequencing of ctDNA can be directed towards a genetic panel constructed based on mutational hotspots for the cancer of interest. This is especially important for informing treatment in situations where mutations are identified in druggable targets. Personalizing targeted analysis of ctDNA to each patient is also possible by combining liquid biopsies with standard primary tissue biopsies. Whole genome or whole exome sequencing of the primary tumor biopsy allows for discovery of genetic mutations specific to a patient's tumor, and can be used for subsequent targeted sequencing of the patient's ctDNA. The highest sensitivity of ctDNA detection is accomplished through targeted sequencing of specific single nucleotide polymorphisms (SNPs). Commonly mutated genes, such as oncogenes, which typically have hotspot mutations, are good candidates for targeted sequencing approaches. Conversely, most tumor suppressor genes have a wide array of possible loss of function mutations throughout the gene, and as such are not suitable for targeted sequencing.

Targeted approaches have the advantage of amplifying ctDNA through polymerase chain reactions (PCR) or digital PCR. This is especially important when analyzing ctDNA not only because there are relatively low levels of DNA circulating in the bloodstream, but also because ctDNA makes up a small proportion of the total cell-free DNA extracted. Therefore, amplification of regions of interest can drastically improve sensitivity of ctDNA detection. However, amplification through PCR can introduce errors given the inherent error rate of DNA polymerases. Errors introduced during sequencing can also decrease the sensitivity of detecting ctDNA mutations.

===== Droplet digital polymerase chain reaction =====
Droplet digital PCR (ddPCR) is derived from the digital polymerase chain reaction, originally named by Bert Vogelstein's group at Johns Hopkins University. Droplet Digital PCR utilizes a droplet generator to partition single pieces of DNA into droplets using an oil/water emulsion. Then individual polymerase chain reactions occur in each droplet using selected primers against regions of ctDNA and proceeds to endpoint. The presence of the sequences of interest is measured by fluorescent probes, which bind to the amplified region. ddPCR allows for highly quantitative assessment of allele and mutant frequencies in ctDNA but is limited by the number of fluorescent probes that can be used in one assay (up to 5). The sensitivity of the assay can vary depending on the amount of DNA analyzed and is around 1 in 10,000. Specificity should be augmented through the use of either minor groove binding (MGB) modified probes or of an alternative such as locked nucleic acids (LNAs).

===== Beads, emulsification, amplification, and magnetics =====
Beads, emulsification, amplification, and magnetics (BEAMing) is a technique that builds upon Droplet Digital PCR in order to identify mutations in ctDNA using flow cytometry. After ctDNA is extracted from blood, PCR is performed with primers designed to target the regions of interest. These primers also contain specific DNA sequences, or tags. The amplified DNA is mixed with streptavidin-coated magnetic beads and emulsified into droplets. Biotinylated primers designed to bind to the tags are used to amplify the DNA. Biotinylation allows the amplified DNA to bind to the magnetic beads, which are coated with streptavidin. After the PCR is complete, the DNA-bound beads are separated using a magnet. The DNA on the beads are then denatured and allowed to hybridize with fluorescent oligonucleotides specific to each DNA template. The resulting bead-DNA complexes are then analyzed using flow cytometry. This technique is able to capture allele and mutation frequencies due to coupling with ddPCR. However, unlike with ddPCR, a larger number of DNA sequences can be interrogated due to the flexibility of using fluorescently bound probes. Another advantage of this system is that the DNA isolated can also be used for downstream sequencing. Sensitivity is 1.6 in 10^{4} to 4.3 in 10^{5}.

===== Cancer Personalized Profiling by deep Sequencing =====
Cancer personalized profiling by deep sequencing (CAPP-Seq) was originally described by Ash Alizadeh and Maximilian Diehn's groups at Stanford University. This technique uses biotinylated oligonucleotide selector probes to target sequences of DNA relevant to ctDNA detection. Publicly available cancer databases were used to construct a library of probes against recurrent mutations in cancer by calculating their recurrence index. The protocol was optimized for the low DNA levels observed in ctDNA collection. Then the isolated DNA undergoes deep sequencing for increased sensitivity. This technique allows for the interrogation of hundreds of DNA regions. The ctDNA detection sensitivity of CAPP-Seq is reported to be 2.5 molecules in 1,000,000.

===== Tagged amplicon deep sequencing =====
Tagged amplicon deep sequencing (TAM-Seq) allows targeted sequencing of entire genes to detect mutations in ctDNA. First a general amplification step is performed using primers that span the entire gene of interest in 150-200bp sections. Then, a microfluidics system is used to attached adaptors with a unique identifier to each amplicon to further amplify the DNA in parallel singleplex reactions. This technique was shown to successfully identify mutations scattered in the TP53 tumor suppressor gene in advanced ovarian cancer patients. The sensitivity of this technique is 1 in 50.

===== Safe-sequencing =====
Safe-sequencing (Safe-Seq) was originally described by Bert Vogelstein and his group at Johns Hopkins University. Safe-Seq decreases the error rate of massively parallel sequencing in order to increase the sensitivity to rare mutants. It achieves this by addition of a unique identifier (UID) sequence to each DNA template. The DNA is then amplified using the added UIDs and sequenced. All DNA molecules with the same UID (a UID family) should have the same reported DNA sequence since they were amplified from one molecule. However, mutations can be introduced through amplification, or incorrect base assignments may be called in the sequencing and analysis steps. The presence of the UID allows these methodology errors to be separated from true mutations of the ctDNA. A mutation is considered a 'supermutant' if 95% of the sequenced reads are in agreement. The sensitivity of this approach is 9 in 1 million.

===== Duplex sequencing =====
Duplex sequencing is an improvement on the single UIDs added in the Safe-Seq technique. In duplex sequencing, randomized double-stranded DNA act as unique tags and are attached to an invariant spacer. Tags are attached to both ends of a DNA fragment (α and β tags), which results in two unique templates for PCR - one strand with an α tag on the 5' end and a β tag on the 3' end and the other strand with a β tag on the 5' end and an α tag on the 3' end. These DNA fragments are then amplified with primers against the invariant sequences of the tags. The amplified DNA is sequenced and analyzed. DNA with the duplex adaptors are compared and mutations are only accepted if there is a consensus between both strands. This method takes into account both errors from sequencing and errors from early stage PCR amplification. The sensitivity of the approach to discovering mutants is 1 in 10^7.

===== Integrated digital error suppression-enhanced CAPP-Seq =====
Integrated digital error suppression (iDES) improves CAPP-Seq analysis of ctDNA in order to decrease error and therefore increase sensitivity of detection. Reported in 2016, iDES combines CAPP-Seq with duplex barcoding sequencing technology and with a computational algorithm that removes stereotypical errors associated with the CAPP-Seq hybridization step. The method also integrates duplex sequencing where possible, and includes methods for more efficient duplex recovery from cell free DNA. The sensitivity of this improved version of CAPP-Seq is 4 in 100,000 copies.

===== Whole-genome sequencing =====
Whole-genome sequencing investigations have been performed on ctDNA present in different patients with treatment-resistant prostate cancer (the vast majority, and in some cases, metastatic), bladder cancer, and control patients who did not present this DNA, including somatic mutations and structural rearrangements in their genomes.

This novel technique has provided information on resistance to treatment with androgen receptor signaling inhibitors, intratumoral heterogeneity (thanks to phylogenetic evolution and molecular chronology), chromosomal instability, contribution of ctDNA to metastasis through global transcriptomic patterns. In this way, the genomic and transcriptomic evolution of ctDNA can be observed and performed in living patients who are developing resistance to treatment. ctDNA sequencing enables identifying clinically relevant differences in the cancer phenotype and seeing how therapy is affecting patients.

Further work is needed to understand how metastatic location and size, in relation to tumor burden, influence circulating tumor DNA and the choice of new techniques to select other lesions that reflect clinically dominant disease.

== Considerations ==
=== "Normal" vs tumor DNA detection ===
One of the challenges in using ctDNA as a cancer biomarker is whether ctDNA can be distinguished with cfDNA from normal cells. cfDNA is released by non-malignant cells during normal cellular turnover, but also during procedures such as surgery, radiotherapy, or chemotherapy. It is thought that leukocytes are the primary contributors to cfDNA in serum.

== Research ==
=== ctDNA in cancer screening ===
The clinical utility of ctDNA for the detection of primary disease is in part limited by the sensitivity of current technology to detect small tumors with low levels of ctDNA present and a priori unknown somatic mutations.

=== ctDNA in cancer monitoring ===
Evidence of disease by traditional imaging methods, such as CT, PET or MRI may be absent after tumor resection. Therefore, ctDNA analysis poses a potential avenue to detect minimal residual disease (MRD), and thus the possibility of tumor recurrence, in cases where bulk tumors are absent by conventional imaging methods. A comparison of MRD detection by CT imaging compared to ctDNA has been previously done in individuals with stage II colon cancer; in this study, researchers were able to detect ctDNA in individuals who showed no sign of clinical malignancy by a CT scan, suggesting that ctDNA detection has greater sensitivity to assess MRD. However, the authors acknowledge that ctDNA analysis is not without limitations; plasma samples collected post-operatively were only able to predict recurrence at 36 months in 48% of cases. Subsequently, ctDNA assays have been developed for pancreatic cancer, colorectal cancer and melanoma.

These approaches are now used in the detection of minimal residual disease using both tumor-informed and tumor-agnostic approaches.

=== ctDNA as a prognostic biomarker ===
The question of whether measurement of the amount or qualities of ctDNA could be used to determine outcomes in people with cancer has been a subject of study. As of 2015 this was very uncertain. Although some studies have shown a trend of higher ctDNA levels in people with high stage metastatic cancer, ctDNA burden does not always correlate with traditional cancer staging. As of 2013 it appeared unlikely that ctDNA would be of clinical utility as a sole predictor of prognosis. However, some recent studies in 2025 have proven that ctDNA monitorization in pancreatic cancer can be used as an independent predictor of overall survival (OS) when evaluated together with clinical risk factors, showing a higher accuracy than conventionally used techniques (CT scan or CA19.9 monitorization in serum).

=== Cancer research ===
The emergence of drug-resistant tumors due to intra- and inter-tumoral heterogeneity an issue in treatment efficacy. A minor genetic clone within the tumor can expand after treatment if it carries a drug-resistant mutation. Initial biopsies can miss these clones due to low frequency or spatial separation of cells within the tumor. For example, since a biopsy only samples a small part of the tumor, clones that resides in a different location may go unnoticed. This can mislead research that focuses on studying the role of tumor heterogeneity in cancer progression and relapse. The use of ctDNA in research can alleviate these concerns because it could provide a more representative 'screenshot' of the genetic diversity of cancer at both primary and metastatic sites. For example, ctDNA has been shown to be useful in studying the clonal evolution of a patient's cancer before and after treatment regimens. Early detection of cancer is still challenging but recent progress in the analysis of the epigenetic features of cfDNA, or the fragmentation pattern unlock improve the sensitivity of liquid biopsy. Furthermore, ctDNA analysis is an emerging tool for understanding the clonal composition of metastatic tumors, detecting different mutations on a genomic scale, studying subclonal diversity that affects the prognosis of the disease as different resistant phenotypes can be found and the appearance of new mechanisms of genomic and transcriptomic resistance to treatment.

=== Challenges for implementation ===
Implementation of ctDNA in clinical practice is largely hindered by the lack of standardized methods for ctDNA processing and analysis. Standardization of methods for sample collection (including time of collection), downstream processing (DNA extraction and amplification), quantification and validation must be established before ctDNA analysis can become a routine clinical assay. Furthermore, creation of a panel of 'standard' tumor-associated biomarkers may be necessary given the resolution of current ctDNA sequencing and detection methods. Sequencing tumor-specific aberrations from plasma samples may also help exclude contaminating cfDNA from analysis; elevated levels of cfDNA from normal cells may be attributed to non-cancer related causes. These sequencing techniques can also determine the clonal evolution of cancer, tumor heterogeneity and drug resistance mechanisms involved in cancer.

== See also ==
- Circulating mitochondrial DNA
- Liquid biopsy
