= Liquid biopsy =

Sampling and analysis of non-solid biological tissues

- Synonyms: Fluid biopsy
- Purpose: analysis of non-solid biological tissue

A liquid biopsy, also known as fluid biopsy or fluid phase biopsy, is the sampling and analysis of non-solid biological tissue, primarily blood. Like traditional biopsy, this type of technique is mainly used as a diagnostic and monitoring tool for diseases such as cancer, with the added benefit of being largely non-invasive. Liquid biopsies may also be used to validate the efficiency of a cancer treatment drug by taking multiple samples in the span of a few weeks. The technology may also prove beneficial for patients after treatment to monitor relapse.

The clinical implementation of liquid biopsies is not yet widespread but is becoming standard of care in some areas.

Liquid biopsy refers to the molecular analysis in biological fluids of nucleic acids, subcellular structures, especially exosomes, and, in the context of cancer, circulating tumor cells.

== Types ==
There are several types of liquid biopsy methods; method selection depends on the condition that is being studied.

Disease	Tissue sampled	Sampling procedure	Invasiveness	Substance isolated	Isolation and detection method	Analysis	Refs
Cancer (various)	Blood	Phlebotomy	Minimally invasive	Circulating tumor cells (CTCs)	Various (e.g. CellSearch, RosetteStep, Dynabeads)	Flow cytometry, nucleic acid extraction, immunocytochemistry, functional assays	
Cancer (various)	Blood	Phlebotomy	Minimally invasive	Circulating tumor DNA (ctDNA)	DNA extraction	Next-generation sequencing	
Urothelial carcinoma	Urine	Urine collection	Non-invasive	Urinary tumor DNA (utDNA)	DNA extraction	Next-generation sequencing	
Non-urological cancers	Urine	Urine collection	Non-invasive	Urine proteins, metabolites	HPLC-MS	Proteomics, metabolomics	
Bladder and prostate cancer	Urine	Urine collection	Non-invasive	Exfoliated cancer cells	Urinalysis	Fluorescence in situ hybridization	
Heart attack	Blood	Phlebotomy	Minimally invasive	Circulating endothelial cells (CECs)	Various (e.g. CellSearch, HD-CEC)	Flow cytometry	
Neurological diseases / brain tumors	Cerebrospinal fluid	Lumbar puncture	Minimally invasive	CSF proteins, nucleic acids	Various	ELISA, multiplex assay, next-generation sequencing	
Prenatal diagnosis	Blood (maternal)	Phlebotomy	Minimally invasive	Cell-free fetal DNA (cffDNA)	DNA extraction	Karyotyping, fluorescent in situ hybridization	
Prenatal diagnosis	Blood (maternal)	Phlebotomy	Minimally invasive	Fetal cells in maternal blood (FCMB)	Flow cytometry	Karyotyping, fluorescent in situ hybridization	
Prenatal diagnosis	Blood (umbilical cord)	Cordocentesis	Invasive	Umbilical blood cells and molecules	Various	Karyotyping, blood typing, blood tests, Kleihauer–Betke test, flow cytometry	
Prenatal diagnosis	Amniotic fluid	Amniocentesis	Invasive	Amniotic fluid cells and molecules	Various	Karyotyping, blood typing, L/S ratio, S/A ratio	

A wide variety of biomarkers may be studied to detect or monitor other diseases. For example, isolation of protoporphyrin IX from blood samples can be used as a diagnostic tool for atherosclerosis. Cancer biomarkers in the blood include PSA (prostate cancer), CA19-9 (pancreatic cancer) and CA-125 (ovarian cancer).

== Mechanism ==
Circulating tumor DNA (ctDNA) refers to DNA released by cancerous cells into the blood stream. Cancer mutations in ctDNA mirror those found in traditional tumor biopsies, which allows them to be used as molecular biomarkers to track the disease. These tests can have sensitive limits of detection, allowing monitoring of minimal residual disease after treatment. Scientists can purify and analyze ctDNA using next-generation sequencing (NGS) or PCR-based methods such as digital PCR. NGS-based methods provide a comprehensive view of a cancer's genetic makeup and is especially useful in diagnosis while digital PCR offers a more targeted approach especially well-suited for detecting minimal residual disease and for monitoring treatment response and disease progression. Recent progress in epigenetics has expanded the use of liquid biopsy for the detection of early-stage cancers, including by approaches such as Cancer Likelihood in Plasma (CLiP) .

Liquid biopsies can detect changes in tumor burden months or years before conventional imaging tests can, making them suitable for early tumor detection, monitoring, and detection of resistance mutations. The increase in the adoption of NGS in various research fields, advancement in NGS, and increase in the adoption of personalized medicine are expected to drive growth in the global liquid biopsy market.

== Clinical application ==
In cancer, liquid biopsy can be used for either multi-cancer screening tests, when solid tumor biopsies are not possible, to compare different treatments as part of clinical trials, to inform decisions for doctors/patients on which precision medicine treatment to select, and for minimal residual disease detection (disease monitoring). Liquid biopsy of circulating tumor DNA for EGFR-mutated lung cancer is approved by the FDA.

The CellSearch method for enumeration of circulating tumor cells in metastatic breast, metastatic colon, and metastatic prostate cancer has been validated and approved by the FDA as a useful prognostic method.

== See also ==
- Radiographic imaging
- Cancer screening#Blood tests
- Circulating free DNA
