= Chronic endothelial injury hypothesis =

The chronic endothelial injury hypothesis is one of two major mechanisms postulated to explain the underlying cause of atherosclerosis and coronary heart disease (CHD), the other being the lipid hypothesis. Although an ongoing debate involving connection between dietary lipids and CHD sometimes portrays the two hypotheses as being opposed, they are in no way mutually exclusive. Moreover, since the discovery of the role of LDL cholesterol (LDL-C) in the pathogenesis of atherosclerosis, the two hypotheses have become tightly linked by a number of molecular and cellular processes.

== Origins of the hypothesis ==
Ross and Glomset initially proposed that endothelial cell uncovering was the first step in the development of atherosclerosis. Other hypotheses have associated the role of infectious agents (e.g. cytomegalovirus, Chlamydia pneumoniae and Helicobacter pylori) in inflammatory responses in the arterial wall. Currently, most research seems to focus on inflammatory processes which associate endothelial dysfunction with lipoprotein accumulation.

== The inflammatory process ==
The first phase of the inflammatory process is marked by the accumulation of lipid and low-density lipoprotein (LDL) particles beneath the endothelium. This is followed by the attachment of leukocytes, monocytes, and T-lymphocytes to the endothelial cell surface. Leukocytes migrate to the subendothelial space and aggregate within the intima.

In the presence of elevated levels of oxidized LDL (ox-LDL), monocytes are converted to activated macrophages. Macrophages accumulate modified lipid particles and become foam cells. The formation of foam cells and their continued accumulation in the intima lead to the formation of fatty streaks. Continued cell migration and proliferation eventually result in the formation of a fibrous plaque.

== The role of oxidized LDL ==
Once LDL accumulates in the subendothelial space, it tends to become modified or oxidized. This oxidized LDL plays several key roles in furthering the course of the inflammatory process. It is chemotactic to monocytes; oxidized LDL causes endothelial cells to secrete molecules that cause monocytes to penetrate between the endothelial cells and accumulate in the intima.

Oxidized LDL promotes death of endothelial cells by augmenting apoptosis. Also, through the activation of collagenases, ox-LDL contributes to a process which may lead to the rupture of the fibrous plaque Oxidized LDL decreases the availability of endothelial nitric oxide (NO), which, in turn, increases the adhesion of monocytes to the endothelium. Moreover, NO is involved in paracrine signalling between the endothelium and the smooth muscle that maintains vascular tone; without it, the muscle will not relax, and the blood vessel remains constricted. Thus, oxidized LDL also contributes to the hypertension often seen with atherosclerosis.

== Implications for the treatment and prevention of atherosclerosis ==
The role LDL plays suggests two different approaches to treatment and prevention. The first approach involves discouraging the accumulation of LDL by lowering the levels of serum LDL, an idea more closely associated with the lipid hypothesis. A major breakthrough involved the discovery of statins, a class of drugs which help to clear LDL from the bloodstream. It has been demonstrated conclusively that elevated levels of LDL are associated with higher risk of mortality from coronary heart disease (CHD); it has also been shown that statins substantially lower the risk of mortality in patients with high LDL.

A second approach would be to discourage the oxidation of LDL, thereby breaking the inflammatory cycle. Lipoproteins consist of a packaging of triglycerides and esterified cholesterol within a monolayer shell consisting of phospholipids and a class of proteins called apolipoproteins. The phospholipids are amphipathic, consisting of a hydrophobic tail which faces inwards, binding with the triglycerides and cholesterol, and a hydrophilic head which faces outwards, making the lipoproteins water-soluble.

Polyunsaturated fatty acids (PUFA) contained in the outer shell make the lipoproteins especially susceptible to oxidation. However, lipoproteins also contain antioxidants which protect the components, vitamin E and carotenoids being the two major naturally occurring antioxidants in human lipoprotein.

Although some studies have shown positive results following anti-oxidant therapy with vitamin C, vitamin E therapy has attracted the most public attention. There have been some positive results, though recent studies have shown no benefit for antioxidant therapy on mortality among patients at risk for CHD.,

== Implications for diet: Dietary lipids and LDL levels ==
An early incarnation of the lipid hypothesis which focused on hypercholesterolemia lead to the suggestion that mortality from CHD might be reduced by controlling dietary input of cholesterol. Studies have demonstrated that increasing dietary cholesterol leads to an increase in both total cholesterol (TC) and LDL Cholesterol (LDL-C), however it also leads to increases in the level of high-density lipoprotein cholesterol (HDL-C), offsetting the effect of the increase in LDL-C. Epidemiological studies which attempted to correlate dietary cholesterol with risk of mortality in CHD have produced mixed results.

Recent studies have focused more on the ratio of saturated fatty acids (SFAs) and polyunsaturated fatty acids (PUFAs) in the diet. It has been demonstrated that intake of SFA raises TC in humans, whereas PUFA lowers TC; however SFA also increases the level of HDL-C, once more offsetting the effect of increased TC. Studies of individual fatty acids show that some SFAs, e.g. stearic acid and palmitic acid have little effect of LDL-C levels; stearic acid actually lowers the LDL/HDL ratio due to a greater increase of HDL-C levels relative to TC.

Epidemiological studies designed to test the relationship between high SFA/PUFA ratios and CHD mortality have tended to produce mixed results. Two recent studies provide an example of this lack of consensus: a study from Poland correlated a decline in CHD mortality with a decrease in the ratio of SFA to PUFA in the population's diet following the collapse of communism. Yet a large population study from Sweden covering roughly the same time period showed no association between fat intake and CHD.

== The AHA guidelines and the beginning of a controversy ==
The early studies associating the ratio of dietary SFA and PUFA with TC levels led the American Heart Association (AHA) to promulgate a set of dietary guidelines which included the recommendation to replace saturated fats found in dairy and meat products with polyunsaturated fats found in natural vegetable oils such as those derived from "corn, cottonseed, and soya". This first set of recommendations, published in the Journal Circulation in 1961, specifically sanctioned the use of products containing partially hydrogenated vegetable oils, i.e. margarine and vegetable shortening. Despite the lack of uncontrovertable epidemiological evidence of their effectiveness, these initial guidelines received widespread acceptance among the medical community in the US.

The suggestion to replace saturated animal fats with partially hydrogenated vegetable oils lead to a reaction which will be discussed below. However, is important to note that the AHA's dietary guidelines have undergone several revisions since the initial report. Although the most recent (2006) guidelines still recommend reducing the consumption of saturated fat, they no longer suggest switching to polyunsaturated fats. Moreover, the guidelines now recommend minimizing the intake of partially hydrogenated fats while increasing the consumption of fish and other sources rich in omega-3 fatty acids. Thus, the position of the AHA is now much closer to that of its critics.

== Criticism of the AHA guidelines: the “Cholesterol Skeptics” ==
Critics of the AHA dietary guidelines point out that incidence of CHD in the US increased markedly during a 60-year period beginning in 1910. During the same period, consumption of saturated fat fell, while consumption of processed vegetable oils rose more than 400%. (Much of the evidence presented to support this claim of a large increase in incidence of CHD in the early part of the century is anecdotal. Statistics covering the period from 1950 to 1980 show that mortality from CHD in the US, although much higher than in most other countries, began to decline slowly after 1966 (mortality in the UK, although initially much lower than in the US, rose continuously during this period). These are mortality figures; the downward trend in the US probably reflects improvements in survival rate and not a decrease in incidence.)

This observation led some critics to invert the AHA guidelines. They stress benefits of dietary SFA, citing presence of natural antioxidants in animal fats, while encouraging people to avoid foods containing processed vegetable oils. They focus on deleterious effect of dietary PUFA, often mentioning two factors: (1) the vulnerability of PUFA to oxidation and the formation of free radicals, and (2) the high ratio of omega-6 to omega-3 PUFA in the more common vegetable oils—those derived from “corn, cottonseed, and soya”. Their considerations are not limited to CHD, they point to an entire litany of inflammatory disorders which can be linked to diet and the consumption of processed vegetable oils. Some critics also question the safety of cholesterol-lowering drugs, suggesting that CHD is best controlled using a combination of diet and exercise.
