= Vulnerable plaque =

Plaque vulnerable to stroke or ischemia

A vulnerable plaque is a kind of atheromatous plaque – a collection of white blood cells (primarily macrophages) and lipids (including cholesterol) in the wall of an artery – that is particularly unstable and prone to produce sudden major events such as a heart attack or stroke.

The defining characteristics of a vulnerable plaque include but are not limited to: a thin fibrous cap, large lipid-rich necrotic core, increased plaque inflammation, vascular remodeling, increased vasa-vasorum neovascularization, and intra-plaque hemorrhage. These characteristics together with the usual hemodynamic pulsating expansion during systole and elastic recoil contraction during diastole contribute to a high mechanical stress zone on the fibrous cap of the atheromatous plaque, making it prone to plaque rupture. Plaque rupture releases highly thrombogenic core material into the vessel lumen and can cause acute thrombotic occlusion resulting in heart attack or stroke. A vulnerable plaque may also suddenly hemorrhage into the core causing expansion of the plaque and severe stenosis or occlusion. Repeated non-occlusive atheroma rupture and healing may result in worsening artery stenosis.

== Formation ==
Current research relating to the formation of vulnerable plaques (see atherosclerosis) suggests that in some regions of increased macrophage activity within an atheromatous plaque, macrophage-induced-enzymes erode away the fibrous membrane beneath the endothelium so that the cover separating the plaque from blood flow in the lumen becomes thin and fragile.

When inflammation is combined with other stresses, such as high blood pressure (increased mechanical stretching and contraction of the arteries with each heart beat), it can cause the thin covering over the plaque to split, spilling the contents of the vulnerable plaque into the bloodstream. Recent studies have shown cholesterol crystals within the plaque play a key role in splitting the plaque and also inducing inflammation.

Upon rupture, atheroma tissue debris may spill into the blood stream; this debris contains cholesterol crystals and other material which is often too large (over 5 micrometers) to pass on through the capillaries downstream. In this, the usual situation, the debris obstruct smaller downstream branches of the artery resulting in temporary to permanent end artery/capillary closure with loss of blood supply to, and death of, the previously supplied tissues. A severe case of this can be seen during angioplasty in the slow clearance of injected contrast down the artery lumen. This situation is often termed no-reflow.

== Detection ==
While a single ruptured plaque can be identified during autopsy as the cause of a coronary event, there is currently no way to identify a culprit lesion before it ruptures.

Artery walls typically enlarge in response to enlarging plaques, a process called vascular remodeling. Due to vascular remodeling, vulnerable plaques do not usually produce much stenosis of the artery lumen. Therefore, they are not detected by cardiac stress tests or angiography, the tests most commonly performed clinically with the goal of predicting susceptibility to future heart attack. In contrast to conventional angiography, cardiac CT angiography does enable visualization of the vessel wall as well as plaque composition. Some of the CT derived plaque characteristics can help predict for acute coronary syndrome. In addition, because these lesions do not produce significant stenoses, they are typically not considered "critical" and/or interventionable by interventional cardiologists, even though research indicates that they are the more important lesions for producing heart attacks.

Medical research reports that there are several imaging techniques, both invasive and non-invasive, that show promise to detect atheromatous plaque and distinguish vulnerable plaque from non-vulnerable plaques, but the benefit of such diagnostic tools have not been shown to be routinely valuable for predicting which plaques will rupture in the immediate future. These imaging techniques include intravascular ultrasound (IVUS), near-infrared spectroscopy (NIRS), and optical coherence tomography (OCT). However, the usefulness of detecting individual vulnerable plaques by invasive methods has been questioned because many "vulnerable" plaques rupture without any associated symptoms and it remains unclear if the risk of invasive detection methods is outweighed by clinical benefit.

There are varying use cases for each of these methods. IVUS, while excellent for performing measurements of plaque burden and lumen obstruction, suffers from its lack of resolution — this often requires post-processing algorithms to resolve this issue. OCT, in contrast, performs well in resolving the image, but has shallow reach and requires constant contrast media to be administered. NIRS is typically used with other imaging modalities like IVUS since it is very accurate in detecting lipid-rich plaques and it lacks the structural information needed to provide a standalone image that can be interpreted.

Other approaches to detecting vulnerable plaque include several non-invasive measures such as coronary computed tomography angiography (CCTA) or cardiac computed tomography angiography, magnetic resonance imaging (MRI), and positron emission tomography (PET). These detection methods are typically used as a screening method to determine if a patient is required to undergo a more serious invasive detection protocol.

As with the invasive approaches, these non-invasive methods also have their own unique distinctions from each other. CCTA provides high resolution of plaque characteristics. MRI can identify the number of plaques and analyze their composition but suffers from lower resolution compared to CCTA and the usual MRI issues that are present in a typical MRI. These issues include its time-consuming nature, motion artifacts due to cardiac motion, and its limited sensitivity. PET, as a relatively less proven modality, shows promise in detecting the plaques' metabolic activity, but it will need to be further examined to be on par with the other two modalities.

Detection of Vulnerable Plaque
Invasive Methods	Non-invasive Methods
Intravascular ultrasound (IVUS)	Computed tomography angiography (CCTA)
Optical coherence tomography (OCT)	Magnetic resonance imaging (MRI)
Near-infrared spectroscopy (NIRS)	Positron emission tomography (PET)
	Intima-media thickness (IMT)

Table 1. Imaging modalities for the detection of vulnerable plaque, categorized into invasive and non-invasive techniques.

Another approach to detecting and understanding plaque behavior, used in research and by a few clinicians, is to use ultrasound to non-invasively measure intimal wall thickness (IMT) in portions of larger arteries closest to the skin, such as the carotid. Pignoli et al. were able to 1) characterize reflections in arterial walls from ultrasound energy reflection and 2) identify the "truth" of measurements for intimal and medial thickness. Proposed and validated in the 1980s, this technique has proven to be effective to detect vulnerable plaque. While stability vs. vulnerability cannot be readily distinguished through IMT, quantitative baseline measurements of the thickest portions of the arterial wall (locations with the most plaque accumulation) can be. Documenting the IMT, location of each measurement and plaque size, a basis for tracking and partially verifying the effects of medical treatments on the progression, stability, or potential regression of plaque, within a given individual over time, may be achieved.

Artificial intelligence (AI) could improve the detection and prognostication of vulnerable plaque in coronary arteries. AI also has the potential to improve the identification and quantification of vulnerable plaques in coronary arteries. AI might reduce observer variability, improve accuracy, and improve speed of evaluating images of vulnerable plaque. Moving forward, however, AI needs testing, development, and validation.

== Vulnerable plaque vs stable plaque ==
The factors involved to promote either a vulnerable plaque or a stable plaque are not clear yet, however, the major differences between a vulnerable and stable plaque are that vulnerable plaques have a ''rich-lipid core'' and a ''thin fibrous cap'' in comparison with the ''thick fibrous cap'' and the ''poor lipid plaque'' present in the stable plaque. In case of a vulnerable plaque, this results in a larger diameter of the Artery Lumen, which means that patient's life style is not affected, however, when the thin fibrous cap breaks, this causes a prompt activation of platelets which causes the occlusion of the artery, which causes a sudden heart attack if it occurs in the coronary artery.

Concerning stable plaques, the thick fibrous cap avoids the breaking risks, however, it reduces significantly the artery diameter which causes the cardiovascular problems related to the decreasing of vessel's diameter (this is determined by the Hagen–Poiseuille equation which explains how flow-rate is related to the radius of the vessel to the fourth power).

== Prevention ==
Statin medications stabilize atheromatous plaques. Patients also can lower their risk for vulnerable plaque rupture in the same ways that they can cut their heart attack risk: quit smoking, optimize lipoprotein patterns, keep blood glucose levels in an acceptable range (see HbA1c), stay slender, eat a proper diet, and exercise. Researchers also think that obesity and diabetes may be tied to high levels of C-reactive protein.

== History ==
The concept of plaque rupture was first reported in 1844, but the term "vulnerable plaque" was not coined until 1989.
