= Lp-LpA2 =

Lipoprotein Associated Phospholipase A2 has been identified and verified in multiple human trials as an enzymatic activity which is an independent predictor of atherosclerotic disease progression and events in humans, including coronary heart disease, because it promotes oxidation of lipoproteins and certain fatty acids.

It is available to physicians and patients as a blood test from multiple clinical labs, including LipoScience, and is commonly promoted as the PLAC test. It does not actually measure or reflect the amount of atherosclerotic plaque present, only one factor affecting progression of existing atherosclerotic plaques.

As of 2009, there is no treatment for elevated levels of this enzymatic activity, though inhibitors are in development and clinical trials. Thus currently it is only a marker which can serve as an indicator for more aggressive treatment of those physiologic behaviors which can be changed to slow/halt progression of atherosclerosis.
