= Russell Ross =

American pathologist (1929–1999)

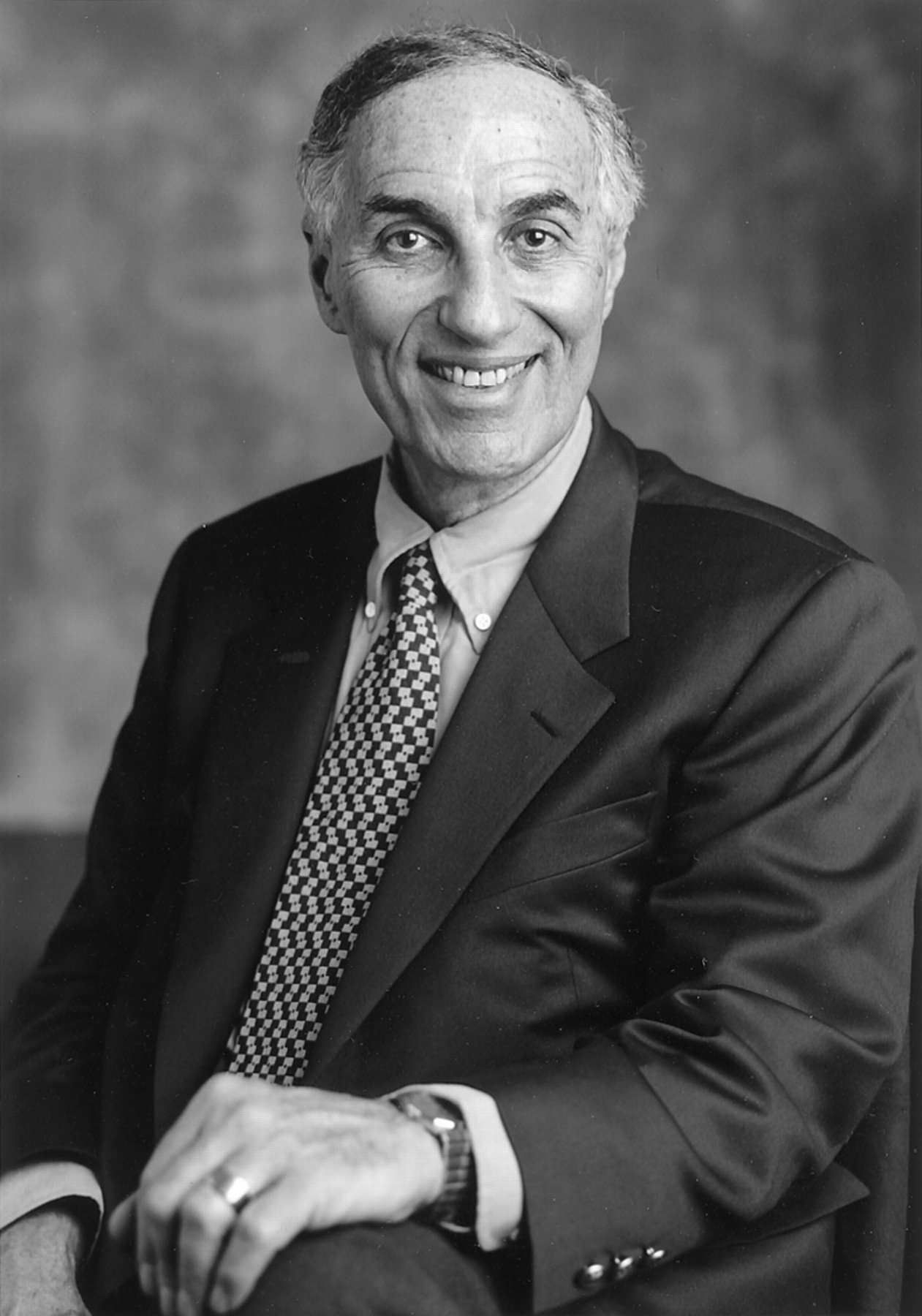
- Ross in 1994
- Born: May 25, 1929; St. Augustine, Florida
- Died: March 18, 1999 (aged 69); Seattle, Washington
- Occupation: professor of pathology
- Known for: "Response to Injury Hypothesis" for atherosclerosis

Russell Ross (1929–1999) was an American professor of pathology, known for research on the pathogenesis of atherosclerosis.

== Education and career ==
Russell Ross grew up in Jacksonville, Florida and graduated from Cornell University in 1951 before earning a degree in dentistry from Columbia University College of Dental Medicine in 1955. In 1958 he became a doctoral student and received a PhD in experimental pathology from the University of Washington at Seattle in 1962. At the University of Washington at Seattle, Dr. Ross joined the faculty of the University of Washington School of Medicine and was appointed Professor of Pathology in 1969. He served as chair of the Department of Pathology and helped to create an important center for research and medical training in vascular biology and pathology.

Ross was awarded a Guggenheim Fellowship for the academic year 1966–1967, which he spent studying cell culture at the Strangeways Research Laboratory. He received many awards and honors and was the author or co-author of 385 published papers and book chapters. Russ was a co-editor, with Valentín Fuster and Eric J. Topol, of the textbook Atherosclerosis and Coronary Artery Disease. He was elected a fellow of the American Academy of Arts and Sciences and a member of the Institute of Medicine of the National Academy of Sciences. He served a term as president of the American Society for Investigative Pathology and in 1992 received the Society's Rous-Whipple Award. He was a member of the editorial boards of more than 20 scientific journals.

... Russ made notable contributions to the understanding of the pathogenesis of atherosclerosis. Together with John Glomset, Russ formulated the "Response to Injury Hypothesis" of atherosclerosis in 1973. The hypothesis, which has been tested and modified from its original formulation, has had a profound impact on atherosclerosis research and vascular biology. Instead of a site for passive accumulation of blood lipids, the artery wall is now seen as a living, reactive tissue capable of mounting an inflammatory response. Russ and his colleagues are credited with many major discoveries, among them the work with Dr. Daniel Bowen-Pope on the identification of platelet-derived growth factor receptors. More recently Russ's laboratory has done studies on the early diagnosis and evolution of atherosclerotic lesions in humans, primates, and various animal models. Dr. Elaine Raines, Russ's close collaborator and associate for 26 years, was a major participant in most of the work from the laboratory.

== Personal life ==
He participated in many community activities and was a member of the board of directors for the Seattle Symphony. Upon his death he was survived by his wife, a son, and a daughter.

== See also ==
- Chronic endothelial injury hypothesis
