= AFAP1L2 =

Protein-coding gene found in humans

Identifiers
- Aliases: AFAP1L2, KIAA1914, XB130, CTB-1144G6.4, actin filament associated protein 1 like 2
- External IDs: OMIM: 612420; MGI: 2147658; GeneCards: AFAP1L2
Available structures
PDB	Ortholog search: PDBe RCSB
PDB	List of PDB id codes 2COF

Gene location (Human)
Chr.	Chromosome 10 (human)
Band	10q25.3	Start	114,294,824 bp
Band	10q25.3	End	114,404,756 bp

Gene location (Mouse)
Chr.	Chromosome 19 (mouse)
Band	19|19 D2	Start	56,912,361 bp
Band	19|19 D2	End	57,008,228 bp
RNA expression pattern
Bgee	Human / Mouse (ortholog); Top expressed in: sural nerve; left lobe of thyroid gland; right lobe of thyroid gland; spleen; buccal mucosa cell; body of uterus; right uterine tube; cerebellar hemisphere; right hemisphere of cerebellum; canal of the cervix / Top expressed in: secondary oocyte; primary oocyte; zygote; otolith organ; utricle; sciatic nerve; external carotid artery; decidua; left lung lobe; gastrula; More reference expression data
BioGPS	n/a
Gene ontology
Molecular function	SH3 domain binding; SH2 domain binding; protein tyrosine kinase activator activity; signaling adaptor activity
Cellular component	cytoplasm; plasma membrane; cytosol
Biological process	positive regulation of transcription, DNA-templated; inflammatory response; regulation of signal transduction; positive regulation of epidermal growth factor receptor signaling pathway; positive regulation of interleukin-8 production; regulation of mitotic cell cycle; regulation of interleukin-6 production; positive regulation of protein tyrosine kinase activity
Sources:Amigo / QuickGO
Orthologs
Databases	NCBI: entry; OMA: entry
Species	Human	Mouse
Entrez	84632	226250
Ensembl	ENSG00000169129	ENSMUSG00000025083
UniProt	Q8N4X5	Q5DTU0
RefSeq (mRNA)	NM_001001936; NM_001287824; NM_032550; NM_001351064; NM_001351065 NM_001351066; NM_001351067; NM_001351068; NM_001351069; NM_001351070; NM_001351071; NM_001351072; NM_001351073; NM_001351074; NM_001351075; NM_001351076; NM_001351077; NM_001351078; NM_001351079; NM_001351080	NM_001177796; NM_001177797; NM_146102
RefSeq (protein)	NP_001001936; NP_001274753; NP_115939; NP_001337993; NP_001337994 NP_001337995; NP_001337996; NP_001337997; NP_001337998; NP_001337999; NP_001338000; NP_001338001; NP_001338002; NP_001338003; NP_001338004; NP_001338005; NP_001338006; NP_001338007; NP_001338008; NP_001338009	NP_001171267; NP_001171268; NP_666214
Location (UCSC)	Chr 10: 114.29 – 114.4 Mb	Chr 19: 56.91 – 57.01 Mb
PubMed search
- Wikidata
View/Edit Human	View/Edit Mouse

Actin filament-associated protein 1-like 2 is a protein that in humans is encoded by the gene AFAP1L2 (previously KIAA1914 or XB130). The protein is a cytosolic adaptor protein and signal transduction mediator. AFAP1L2 regulates cell proliferation, cell survival, cell motility and gene expression. AFAP1L2 is highly similar to AFAP and is thus known as actin filament associated protein 1-like 2 (AFAP1L2). AFAP1L2 is a substrate and regulator of multiple tyrosine kinase-mediated signaling. AFAP1L2 is highly expressed in the thyroid and spleen.

== Molecular structure ==
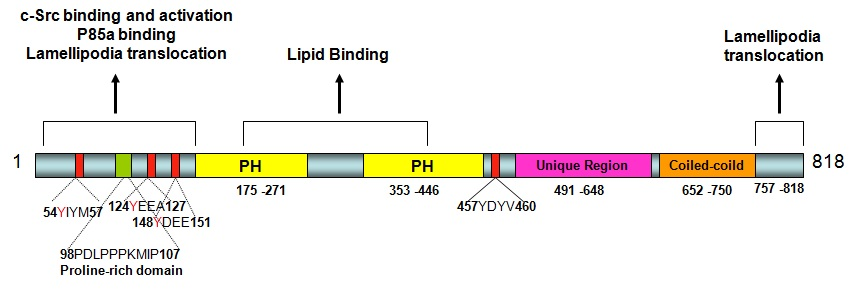
Schematic representation of XB130 protein structure

The XB130 gene is located on human chromosome 10q25.3 and encodes an 818 amino acid protein. It has a molecular weight of approximately 130 kDa and is structurally similar to actin-filament-associated protein (AFAP) and is thus known as AFAP1L2. Several tyrosine phosphorylation sites and a proline rich sequence are included in the N-terminal region of XB130, which allows it to interact and activate c-Src-containing proteins, as well as bind to p85α of PI3K. Two pleckstrin-homology domains are located in the middle portion, giving XB130 its lipid-binding ability. The C-terminal region contains a coiled-coil domain, which shares partial similarity with AFAP's leucine zipper domain. Both the C-terminal and N-terminal regions of XB130 are required for XB130's role in its translocation to the lamellipodia. Despite XB130's structural similarity to AFAP, XB130 does not behave like an actin filament-associated protein. The actin-binding site present in AFAP is only partially present in XB130.

== Function ==
=== Role in cell cycle and survival ===
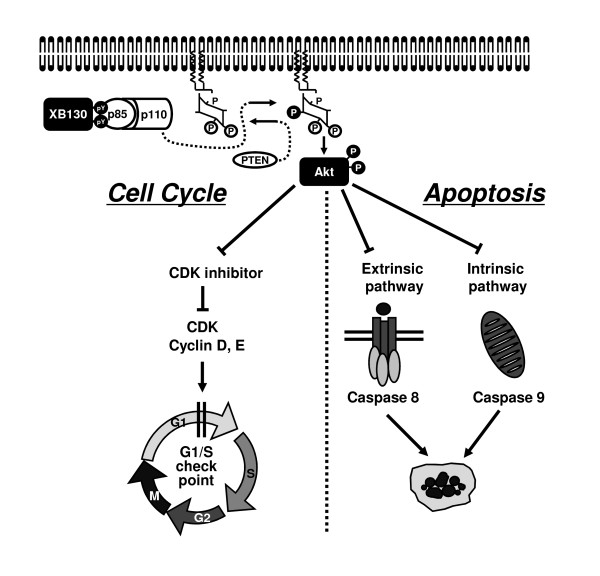
Roles of XB130 in cell cycle and survival of cancer.

XB130 has been demonstrated to play a role in cell proliferation and survival through the regulation of the PI3K/Akt signaling pathway. When tyrosine phosphorylated, XB130 has the ability to interact with the p85ɑ subunit of PI3K through its SH2 domains. This interaction leads to the subsequent activation of Akt, cell proliferation, and cell survival. Activated Akt promotes cell survival and cell cycle progression by phosphorylating and inactivating p21Cip1/WAF1, p27^{Kip1}, and GSK3β, as well as inhibits apoptosis by preventing the cleavage of caspase-8 and caspase-9, which are involved in the extrinsic and intrinsic pathways of cell death, respectively. Alternatively, when the expression of XB130 is suppressed in vitro, Akt phosphorylation and therefore activation becomes significantly reduced. This, in turn, leads to cell cycle arrest at G1/S phase and accelerated apoptosis.

=== Role in cell motility and invasion ===
During cytoskeletal rearrangement, a process required for cell motility, XB130 translocates to the cell periphery. XB130 exhibits a high affinity for peripheral F-actin structures, such as the lamellipodium. The translocation of XB130 to the cell periphery is particularly important in its potential to influence cell migration and metastasis.

=== Role in gene expression ===
The level of XB130 expression influences the expression of multiple genes related to cell proliferation and survival, and microRNAs miR-33a, 149a, and 193a-3p, all of which exhibit tumor suppressive function in thyroid cancer cells.

=== Role in inflammation ===
XB130 mediated c-Src binding and activation increases Interleukin-8 (IL-8), a chemokine produce by lung epithelial cells, which contains AP-1 and SRE transcription factor binding sites. These binding sites can be activated by the downregulation of XB130 expression and lead to a decrease in IL-8 production in lung cells.

== Interactions ==
XB130 (gene) has been known to interact with

- SH2 domain of Src
- SH3 domain of Src
- c-Src
- p85a subunit of PI3K
- RET/PTC
- GTPase-activating proteins (GAP)
- Phospholipase C-gamma (PLC-γ)

== Clinical significance ==
Adaptor proteins play an important role as molecular scaffolds to mediate the transport and interaction of various proteins and is therefore highly involved in signal transduction. Deregulation of adaptor proteins is highly related to the abnormality of cellular functions and many adaptor proteins are frequently overexpressed in cancers. Clinical studies on the expression level and pattern of XB130 in various human tumors demonstrate that XB130 expression is regulated in thyroid and gastrointestinal cancer and soft tissue tumors. Expression level of XB130 was significantly higher in normal and benign lesion than that of papillary and anaplastic/insular carcinoma. Through the studies on many gastrointestinal cancers, the oncogenic roles of XB130 was shown. XB130 expression is significantly correlated with the survival time and disease-free period in gastric cancer patients. XB130 was identified as a potential colorectal cancer markers. XB130 protein level was elevated in human esophageal squamous carcinoma. In addition, XB130 was selected as one of six highly expressed genes related to local aggressiveness of soft tissue tumors in a set of 102 representative tumor samples. These findings suggest that XB130 may be involved in tumorigenesis and that XB130 is a potential diagnostic biomarker and therapeutic target for cancer.

== Discovery ==
This adaptor protein was discovered during molecular cloning of human actin filament associated protein (AFAP1) in the Latner Thoracic Surgery Research Laboratories Toronto, Ontario, Canada. The molecule is named XB130 after lead technician Xiaohui Bai and the molecular mass of the protein. This protein was found to have a high sequence identity to AFAP1, thus its name AFAP1L2.
