= CIMT =

CIMT may refer to:

- CIMT-DT, a Canadian TV station
- Cartoid Intima-Media Thickness (CIMT), see Intima-media thickness, a measurement of the thickness of the innermost layers of the artery
- Constraint-induced movement therapy, a type of rehabilitation therapy
- Crime involving moral turpitude
- fr: Compagnie industrielle de matériel de transport
