= Cholesterol crystal =

Solid, crystalline form of cholesterol

A cholesterol crystal is a solid, crystalline form of cholesterol found in gallstones and atherosclerosis. Gallstones occurring in industrialized societies typically contain more than 70-90% cholesterol by weight, much of which is crystalline. Cholesterol crystals are a hallmark of atherosclerosis, which is believed to be an early cause of atherosclerotic inflammation. Cholesterol phase transition from liquid to crystalline form is linked to inflammation. Cholesterol crystals are believed to induce inflammation by activation of the NLRP3 inflammasome.

In addition to being a source of inflammation, cholesterol crystals are believed to cause mechanical injury by tearing tissue, causing plaque rupture. Impaired removal of cholesterol crystals from demyelinated nerves by macrophages is believed to be associated with multiple sclerosis, and this remyelination failure is particularly impaired in the elderly.
