= Atheroma =

Accumulation of degenerative material in the inner layer of artery walls

- Other names: atheromata (plural), atheromas (plural), atheromatous plaque, plaque
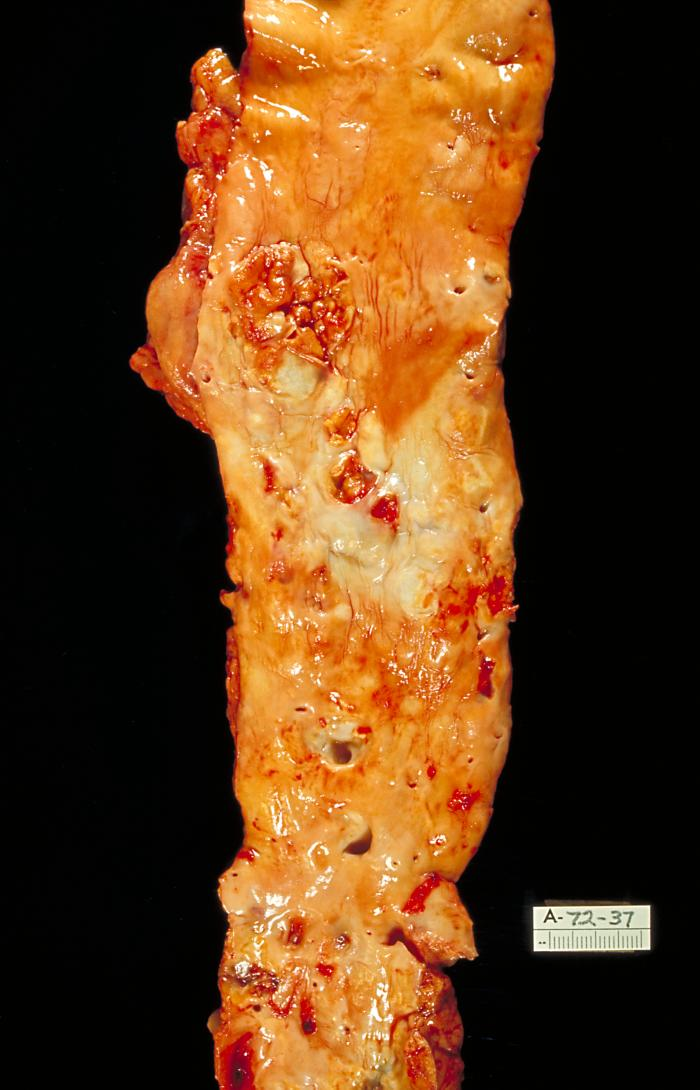
- An autopsy specimen of severe atherosclerotic plaque forming in the aorta.
- Specialty: Cardiology
- Complications: Thrombosis, embolism, atherosclerosis, arteriosclerosis
- Causes: Hyperlipidemia, hypertriglyceridemia, hypercholesterolemia

An atheroma, or atheromatous plaque, is an abnormal accumulation of material in the inner layer of an arterial wall.

The material consists of mostly macrophage cells, or debris, containing lipids, calcium and a variable amount of fibrous connective tissue. The accumulated material forms a swelling in the artery wall, which may intrude into the lumen of the artery, narrowing it and restricting blood flow. Atheroma is the pathological basis for the disease entity atherosclerosis, a subtype of arteriosclerosis.

== Signs and symptoms ==
For most people, the first symptoms result from atheroma progression within the heart arteries, most commonly resulting in a heart attack and ensuing debility. The heart arteries are difficult to track because they are small (from about 5 mm down to microscopic), they are hidden deep within the chest and they never stop moving. Additionally, all mass-applied clinical strategies focus on both minimal cost and the overall safety of the procedure. Therefore, existing diagnostic strategies for detecting atheroma and tracking response to treatment have been extremely limited. The methods most commonly relied upon, patient symptoms and cardiac stress testing, do not detect any symptoms of the problem until atheromatous disease is very advanced because arteries enlarge, not constrict, in response to increasing atheroma. It is plaque ruptures, producing debris and clots which obstruct blood flow downstream, sometimes also locally (as seen on angiograms), which reduce/stop blood flow. Yet these events occur suddenly and are not revealed in advance by either stress tests or angiograms.

== Mechanism ==
The healthy epicardial coronary artery consists of three layers, the tunica intima, media, and adventitia. Atheroma and changes in the artery wall usually result in small enlargements just large enough to compensate for the extra wall thickness with no change in the lumen diameter. However, eventually, typically as a result of rupture of vulnerable plaques and clots within the lumen over the plaque, stenosis (narrowing) of the vessel develops in some areas. Less frequently, the artery enlarges so much that a gross aneurysmal enlargement of the artery results. All three results are often observed, at different locations, within the same individual.

=== Stenosis and closure ===
Over time, atheromata usually progress in size and thickness and induce the surrounding muscular central region (the media) of the artery to stretch out, which is termed remodeling. Typically, remodeling occurs just enough to compensate for the atheroma's size such that the calibre of the artery opening (lumen) remains unchanged, until about 50% of the artery wall cross-sectional area consists of atheromatous tissue.

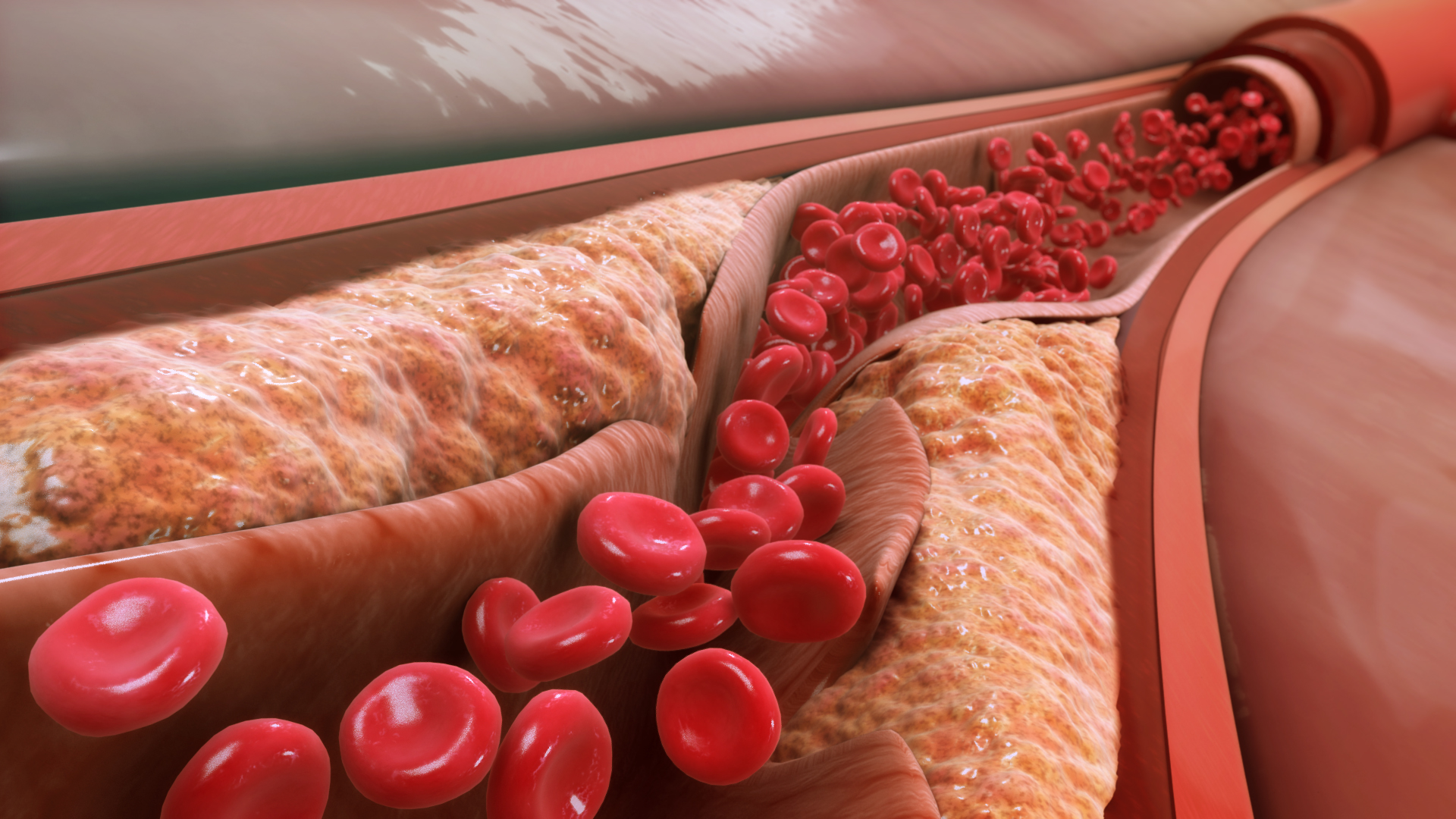
Narrowed arterial blood vessel blocked with an atheroma (artist's conception).

If the muscular wall enlargement eventually fails to keep up with the enlargement of the atheroma volume, or a clot forms and organizes over the plaque, then the lumen of the artery becomes narrowed as a result of repeated ruptures, clots and fibrosis over the tissues separating the atheroma from the blood stream. This narrowing becomes more common after decades of living, increasingly more common after people are in their 30s to 40s.

The endothelium (the cell monolayer on the inside of the vessel) and covering tissue, termed fibrous cap, separate atheroma from the blood in the lumen. If a rupture (see vulnerable plaque) of the endothelium and fibrous cap occurs, then both a shower of debris from the plaque (debris larger than 5 micrometres are too large to pass through capillaries) combined with a platelet and clotting response (an injury/repair response to both the debris and at the rupture site) begins within fractions of a second, eventually resulting in narrowing or sometimes closure of the lumen. Eventually downstream tissue damage occurs due to closure or obstruction of downstream microvessels and/or closure of the lumen at the rupture, both resulting in loss of blood flow to downstream tissues. This is the principal mechanism of myocardial infarction, stroke or other related cardiovascular disease problems.

While clots at the rupture site typically shrink in volume over time, some of the clot may become organized into fibrotic tissue resulting in narrowing of the artery lumen; the narrowings sometimes seen on angiography examinations, if severe enough. Since angiography methods can only reveal larger lumens, typically larger than 200 micrometres, angiography after a cardiovascular event commonly does not reveal what happened.

=== Artery enlargement ===
If the muscular wall enlargement is overdone over time, then a gross enlargement of the artery results, usually over decades of living. This is a less common outcome. Atheroma within aneurysmal enlargement (vessel bulging) can also rupture and shower debris of atheroma and clot downstream. If the arterial enlargement continues to 2 to 3 times the usual diameter, the walls often become weak enough that with just the stress of the pulse, a loss of wall integrity may occur leading to sudden hemorrhage (bleeding), major symptoms and debility; often rapid death. The main stimulus for aneurysm formation is pressure atrophy of the structural support of the muscle layers. The main structural proteins are collagen and elastin. This causes thinning and the wall balloons allowing gross enlargement to occur, as is common in the abdominal region of the aorta.

== Histology ==
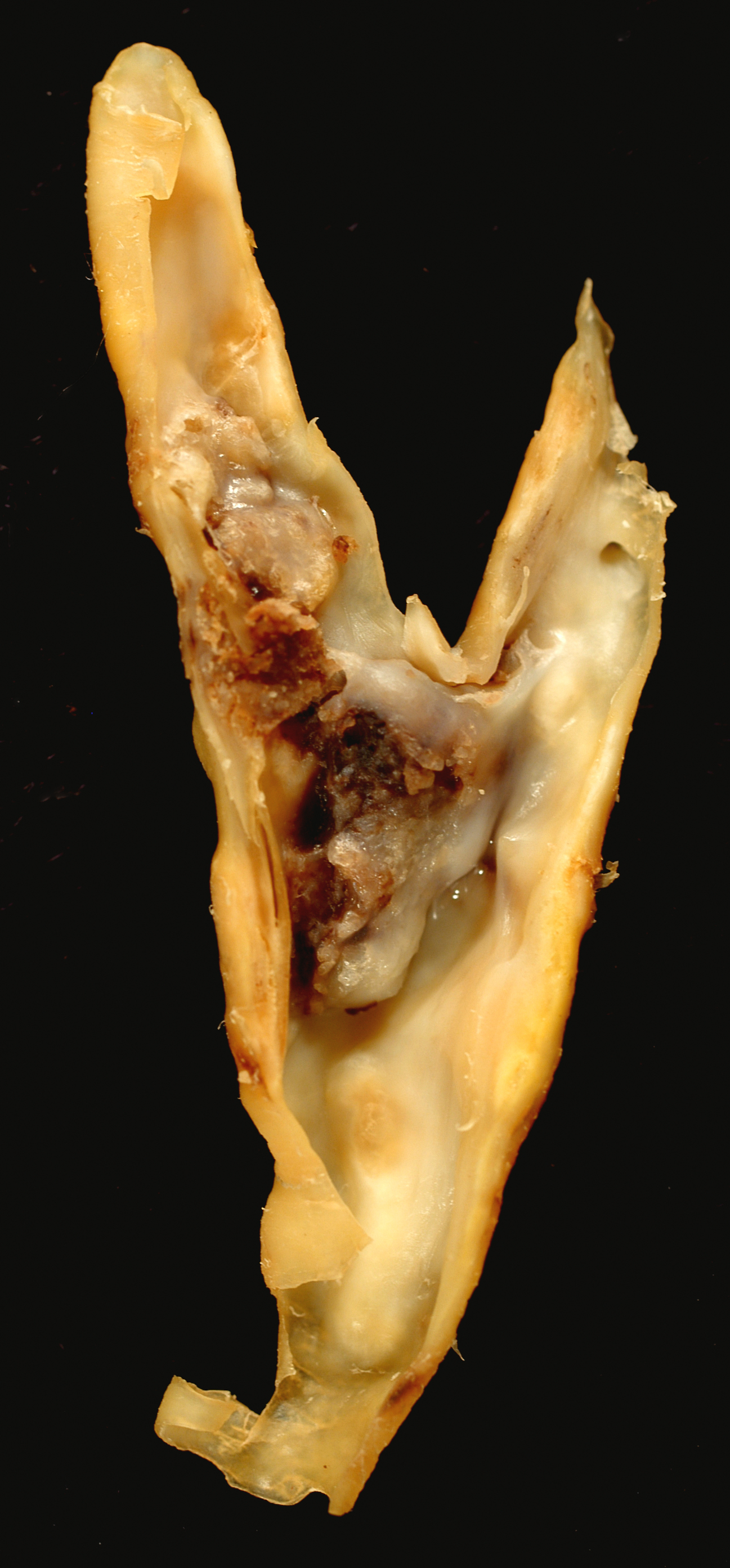
Atherosclerotic plaque from a carotid endarterectomy specimen. This shows the division of the common into the internal and external carotid arteries.

The accumulation (swelling) is always in the tunica intima, between the endothelium lining and the smooth muscle middle layer of the artery wall. While the early stages, based on gross appearance, have traditionally been termed fatty streaks by pathologists, they are not composed of fat cells but of accumulations of foam cells, which are macrophages that have taken up oxidized low-density lipoprotein (LDL).

After they accumulate large amounts of cytoplasmic membranes (with associated high cholesterol content) macrophages are called foam cells. When foam cells die, their contents are released, which attracts more macrophages and creates an extracellular lipid core near the centre to inner surface of each atherosclerotic plaque.

Conversely, the outer, older portions of the plaque become more calcified, less metabolically active and more physically stiff over time.

Veins do not develop atheromata, because they are not subjected to the same haemodynamic pressure that arteries are, unless surgically moved to function as an artery, as in bypass surgery. In fact, veins grafted to function as arteries in bypass surgeries tend to show faster formation of atheromata, while (in rabbits) arteries grafted to function as veins also do not grow atheromata.

== Diagnosis ==
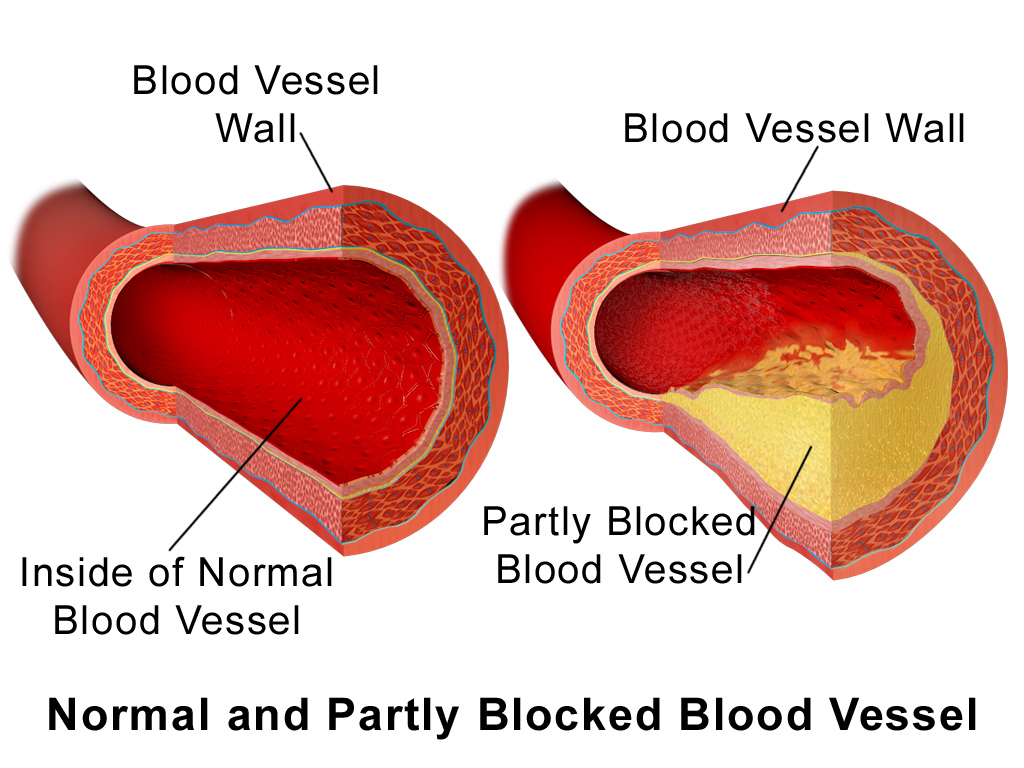
Illustration comparing a normal blood vessel and partially blocked vessel due to atherosclerotic plaque. Notice the enlargement & absence of much luminal narrowing.

Because artery walls enlarge at locations with atheroma, detecting atheroma before death and autopsy has long been problematic at best. Most methods have focused on the openings of arteries; while these methods are highly relevant, they totally miss the atheroma within the arterial lumen.

Historically, arterial wall fixation, staining and thin section has been the gold standard for detection and description of atheroma, after death and autopsy. With special stains and examination, micro calcifications can be detected, typically within smooth muscle cells of the arterial media near the fatty streaks within a year or two of fatty streaks forming.

Interventional and non-interventional methods to detect atherosclerosis, specifically vulnerable plaque (non-occlusive or soft plaque), are widely used in research and clinical practice today.

Carotid Intima-media thickness Scan (CIMT can be measured by B-mode ultrasonography) measurement has been recommended by the American Heart Association as the most useful method to identify atherosclerosis and may now very well be the gold standard for detection.

Intravascular ultrasound and intravascular optical coherence tomography are the current most sensitive method detecting and measuring more advanced atheroma within living individuals, but has had limited applications due to cost and body invasiveness.

CT scans using state of the art higher resolution spiral, or the higher speed EBT, machines have been the most effective method for detecting calcification present in plaque. However, the atheroma have to be advanced enough to have relatively large areas of calcification within them to create large enough regions of ~130 Hounsfield units which a CT scanner's software can recognize as distinct from the other surrounding tissues. Typically, such regions start occurring within the heart arteries about 2–3 decades after atheroma start developing. The presence of smaller, spotty plaques may actually be more dangerous for progressing to acute myocardial infarction.

Arterial ultrasound, especially of the carotid arteries, with measurement of the thickness of the artery wall, offers a way to partially track the disease progression. As of 2006, the thickness, commonly referred to as IMT for intimal-medial thickness, is not measured clinically though it has been used by some researchers since the mid-1990s to track changes in arterial walls. Traditionally, clinical carotid ultrasounds have only estimated the degree of blood lumen restriction, stenosis, a result of very advanced disease. The National Institute of Health did a five-year $5 million study, headed by medical researcher Kenneth Ouriel, to study intravascular ultrasound techniques regarding atherosclerotic plaque. More progressive clinicians have begun using IMT measurement as a way to quantify and track disease progression or stability within individual patients.

Angiography, since the 1960s, has been the traditional way of evaluating for atheroma. However, angiography is only motion or still images of dye mixed with the blood within the arterial lumen and never show atheroma; the wall of arteries, including atheroma within the arterial wall remain invisible. The limited exception to this rule is that with very advanced atheroma, with extensive calcification within the wall, a halo-like ring of radiodensity can be seen in most older humans, especially when arterial lumens are visualized end-on. On cine-floro, cardiologists and radiologists typically look for these calcification shadows to recognize arteries before they inject any contrast agent during angiograms.

=== Classification of lesions ===
- Type I: Isolated macrophage foam cells
- Type II: Multiple foam cell layers
- Type III: Preatheroma, intermediate lesion
- Type IV: Atheroma
- Type V: Fibroatheroma
- Type VI: Fissured, ulcerated, hemorrhagic, thrombotic lesion
- Type VII: Calcific lesion
- Type VIII: Fibrotic lesion

== Treatment ==
Many approaches have been promoted as methods to reduce or reverse atheroma progression:

- quitting tobacco smoking;
- eating fruits, vegetables, nuts, beans, berries, and grains;
- consuming omega−3 fatty acids such as fish, fish-derived supplements, as well as flax seed oil, borage seed oil, and other non-animal-based oils;
- abdominal fat reduction;
- aerobic exercise;
- inhibitors of cholesterol synthesis (known as statins);
- normal blood glucose levels (glycated hemoglobin, also called HbA1c);
- maintaining normal, or healthy, blood pressure levels;
- oligosaccharide 2-hydroxypropyl-β-cyclodextrin (2HPβCD) "is ineffective in inducing atherosclerosis regression".

When a plaque is dangerous enough, it may warrant physical intervention such as percutaneous coronary intervention, coronary artery bypass graft, or carotid endarterectomy. Of these, endarterectomy involves cutting open the affected artery to remove the plaque.

== History of research ==
In developed countries, with improved public health, infection control and increasing life spans, atheroma processes have become an increasingly important problem and burden for society. Atheromata continue to be the primary underlying basis for disability and death, despite a trend for gradual improvement since the early 1960s (adjusted for patient age). Thus, increasing efforts towards better understanding, treating and preventing the problem are continuing to evolve.

According to United States data, 2004, for about 65% of men and 47% of women, the first symptom of cardiovascular disease is myocardial infarction (heart attack) or sudden death (death within one hour of symptom onset).

A significant proportion of artery flow-disrupting events occur at locations with less than 50% lumenal narrowing. Cardiac stress testing, traditionally the most commonly performed non-invasive testing method for blood flow limitations, generally only detects lumen narrowing greater than about 75%, although some physicians advocate nuclear stress tests that can sometimes detect as little as 50%.

The sudden nature of the complications of pre-existing atheroma, vulnerable plaque (non-occlusive or soft plaque), have led, since the 1950s, to the development of intensive care units and complex medical and surgical interventions. Angiography and later cardiac stress testing was begun to either visualize or indirectly detect stenosis. Next came bypass surgery, to plumb transplanted veins, sometimes arteries, around the stenoses and more recently angioplasty, now including stents, most recently drug coated stents, to stretch the stenoses more open.

Yet despite these medical advances, with success in reducing the symptoms of angina and reduced blood flow, atheroma rupture events remain the major problem and still sometimes result in sudden disability and death despite even the most rapid, massive and skilled medical and surgical intervention available anywhere today. According to some clinical trials, bypass surgery and angioplasty procedures have had at best a minimal effect, if any, on improving overall survival. Typically mortality of bypass operations is between 1 and 4%, of angioplasty between 1 and 1.5%.

Additionally, these vascular interventions are often done only after an individual is symptomatic, often already partially disabled, as a result of the disease. It is also clear that both angioplasty and bypass interventions do not prevent future heart attack.

The older methods for understanding atheroma, dating to before World War II, relied on autopsy data. Autopsy data has long shown initiation of fatty streaks in later childhood with slow asymptomatic progression over decades.

One way to see atheroma is the very invasive and costly IVUS ultrasound technology; it gives us the precise volume of the inside intima plus the central media layers of about 25 mm (1 in) of artery length. Unfortunately, it gives no information about the structural strength of the artery. Angiography does not visualize atheroma; it only makes the blood flow within blood vessels visible. Alternative methods that are non or less physically invasive and less expensive per individual test have been used and are continuing to be developed, such as those using computed tomography (CT; led by the electron beam tomography form, given its greater speed) and magnetic resonance imaging (MRI). The most promising since the early 1990s has been EBT, detecting calcification within the atheroma before most individuals start having clinically recognized symptoms and debility. Statin therapy (to lower cholesterol) does not slow the speed of calcification as determined by CT scan. MRI coronary vessel wall imaging, although currently limited to research studies, has demonstrated the ability to detect vessel wall thickening in asymptomatic high risk individuals. As a non-invasive, ionising radiation free technique, MRI based techniques could have future uses in monitoring disease progression and regression. Most visualization techniques are used in research, they are not widely available to most patients, have significant technical limitations, have not been widely accepted and generally are not covered by medical insurance carriers.

From human clinical trials, it has become increasingly evident that a more effective focus of treatment is slowing, stopping and even partially reversing the atheroma growth process. There are several prospective epidemiologic studies including the Atherosclerosis Risk in Communities (ARIC) Study and the Cardiovascular Health Study (CHS), which have supported a direct correlation of Carotid Intima-media thickness (CIMT) with myocardial infarction and stroke risk in patients without cardiovascular disease history. The ARIC Study was conducted in 15,792 individuals between 5 and 65 years of age in four different regions of the US between 1987 and 1989. The baseline CIMT was measured and measurements were repeated at 4- to 7-year intervals by carotid B mode ultrasonography in this study. An increase in CIMT was correlated with an increased risk for CAD. The CHS was initiated in 1988, and the relationship of CIMT with risk of myocardial infarction and stroke was investigated in 4,476 subjects 65 years of age and below. At the end of approximately six years of follow-up, CIMT measurements were correlated with cardiovascular events.

Paroi artérielle et Risque Cardiovasculaire in Asia Africa/Middle East and Latin America (PARC-AALA) is another important large-scale study, in which 79 centres from countries in Asia, Africa, the Middle East, and Latin America participated, and the distribution of CIMT according to different ethnic groups and its association with the Framingham cardiovascular score was investigated. Multi-linear regression analysis revealed that an increased Framingham cardiovascular score was associated with CIMT, and carotid plaque independent of geographic differences.

Cahn et al. prospectively followed-up 152 patients with coronary artery disease for 6–11 months by carotid artery ultrasonography and noted 22 vascular events (myocardial infarction, transient ischemic attack, stroke, and coronary angioplasty) within this time period. They concluded that carotid atherosclerosis measured by this non-interventional method has prognostic significance in coronary artery patients.

In the Rotterdam Study, Bots et al. followed 7,983 patients >55 years of age for a mean period of 4.6 years, and reported 194 incident myocardial infarctions within this period. CIMT was significantly higher in the myocardial infarction group compared to the other group. Demircan et al. found that the CIMT of patients with acute coronary syndrome were significantly increased compared to patients with stable angina pectoris.

It has been reported in another study that a maximal CIMT value of 0.956 mm had 85.7% sensitivity and 85.1% specificity to predict angiographic CAD. The study group consisted of patients admitted to the cardiology outpatient clinic with symptoms of stable angina pectoris. The study showed CIMT was higher in patients with significant CAD than in patients with non-critical coronary lesions. Regression analysis revealed that thickening of the mean intima-media complex more than 1.0 was predictive of significant CAD our patients. There was incremental significant increase in CIMT with the number coronary vessel involved. In accordance with the literature, it was found that CIMT was significantly higher in the presence of CAD. Furthermore, CIMT was increased as the number of involved vessels increased and the highest CIMT values were noted in patients with left main coronary involvement. However, human clinical trials have been slow to provide clinical & medical evidence, partly because the asymptomatic nature of atheromata make them especially difficult to study. Promising results are found using carotid intima-media thickness scanning (CIMT can be measured by B-mode ultrasonography), B-vitamins that reduce a protein corrosive, homocysteine and that reduce neck carotid artery plaque volume and thickness, and stroke, even in late-stage disease.

Additionally, understanding what drives atheroma development is complex with multiple factors involved, only some of which, such as lipoproteins, more importantly lipoprotein subclass analysis, blood sugar levels and hypertension are best known and researched. More recently, some of the complex immune system patterns that promote, or inhibit, the inherent inflammatory macrophage triggering processes involved in atheroma progression are slowly being better elucidated in animal models of atherosclerosis.

== See also ==
- Angiogram
- ApoA-1 Milano
- Atherosclerosis
- Atherothrombosis
- Coronary circulation
- Coronary catheterization
- EBT
- Hemorheologic-Hemodynamic Theory of Atherosclerosis
- Lipoprotein
- LDL, HDL, IDL and VLDL
