= Fatty streak =

Visible lesion indicating atherosclerosis

Progression of atherosclerosis

A fatty streak is the first grossly visible (visible to the naked eye) lesion in the development of atherosclerosis. It appears as an irregular yellow-white discoloration on the luminal surface of an artery. It consists of aggregates of foam cells, which are lipoprotein-loaded macrophages, located in the intima, the innermost layer of the artery, beneath the endothelial cells that layer the lumina through which blood flows. Fatty streaks may also include T cells, aggregated platelets, and smooth muscle cells. Although fatty streaks can develop into atheromas (atheromatous plaques), not all are destined to become advanced lesions.

== Epidemiology ==
Almost all children older than 10 in developed countries have aortic fatty streaks, with coronary fatty streaks beginning in adolescence.

In 1953, a study was published that forever changed the understanding of the development of heart disease. The study examined the results of 300 autopsies performed on U.S. soldiers who had died in the Korean War. Despite the fact that the average age of the soldiers was just 22 years old, 77% of them had visible signs of coronary atherosclerosis. This study showed that heart disease could affect people at a young age and was not just a problem for older individuals.

In 1992, a report had shown that microscopic fatty streaks were noticed in the left anterior descending artery in over 50% of children aged 10–14. And 8% had more notable accumulations of extracellular lipid.

In a 2005 study carried out between 1985–1995, it was found that around 87% of aortas and 30% of coronary arteries in age group 5–14 years had fatty streaks.

== See also ==
- Endothelial dysfunction
