= Atherosclerosis =

Inflammatory disease involving a buildup of lesions in the walls of arteries

- Other names: Arteriosclerotic vascular disease (ASVD), Atherosclerotic cardiovascular disease (ASCVD)
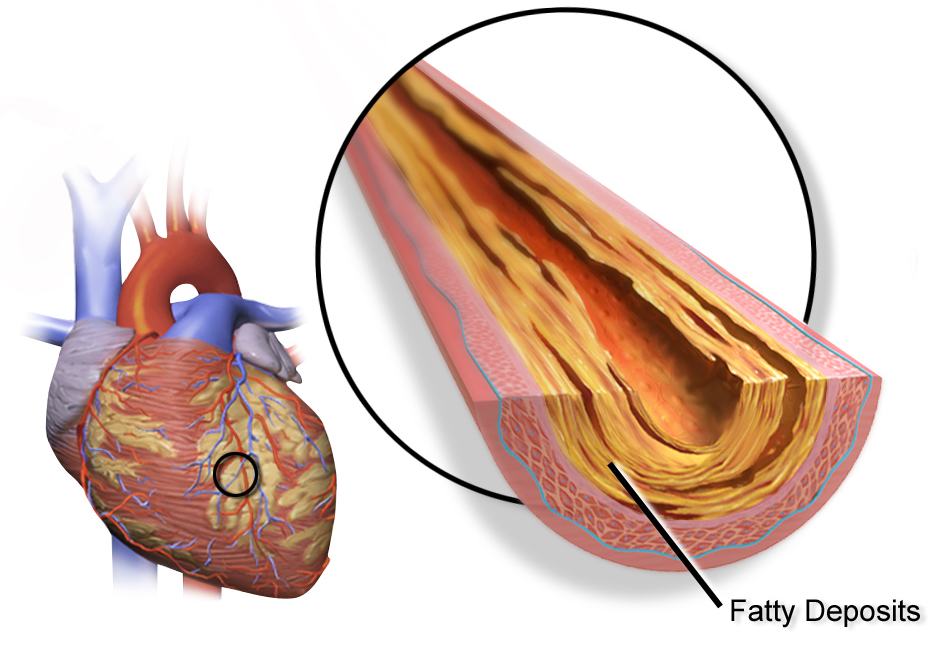
- Illustration depicting atherosclerosis in a coronary artery
- Specialty: Cardiology, vascular surgery, cardiothoracic surgery, interventional radiology
- Symptoms: None
- Complications: Coronary artery disease, stroke, peripheral artery disease, chronic kidney disease, heart disease
- Usual onset: Youth (worsens with age)
- Causes: Elevated LDL cholesterol, smoking, high blood pressure, and diabetes
- Risk factors: High blood pressure, diabetes, smoking, obesity, family history, unhealthy diet (notably saturated fat, trans fat, ultra-processed foods, and hydrogenated oils)
- Prevention: Healthy diet, exercise, not smoking, maintaining a normal weight
- Medication: Statins, blood pressure medication, aspirin
- Frequency: ≈100% (>65 years old)

Atherosclerosis (Note: Also arteriosclerotic vascular disease (ASVD)) is a pattern of the disease arteriosclerosis, characterized by the development of atheromatous plaques in the walls of arteries. This is a chronic inflammatory disease involving many different cell types and is driven by elevated blood levels of cholesterol, primarily LDL. These lesions lead to narrowing of the arteries.

At the onset, there are usually no symptoms, but if they develop, symptoms generally begin around middle age. In severe cases, it can result in coronary artery disease, stroke, peripheral artery disease, or kidney disorders, depending on the body part(s) in which the affected arteries are located.

The exact cause of atherosclerosis is unknown and is proposed to be multifactorial. Risk factors include abnormal cholesterol levels, elevated levels of inflammatory biomarkers, high blood pressure, diabetes, smoking (both active and passive smoking), obesity, genetic factors, family history, lifestyle habits, and an unhealthy diet. Plaque is made up of fat, cholesterol, immune cells, calcium, and other substances found in the blood. The narrowing of arteries limits the flow of oxygen-rich blood to parts of the body. Diagnosis is based upon a physical exam, electrocardiogram, and exercise stress test, among others, depending on the affected artery or arteries.

Prevention guidelines include eating a healthy diet, exercising, not smoking, and maintaining a normal body weight. Treatment of established atherosclerotic disease may include medications to lower cholesterol such as statins, blood pressure medication, and anticoagulant therapies to reduce the risk of blood clot formation. As the disease state progresses, more invasive strategies are applied, such as percutaneous coronary intervention, coronary artery bypass graft, or carotid endarterectomy. In some individuals, genetic factors are also implicated in the disease process and cause a strongly increased predisposition to development of atherosclerosis.

Atherosclerosis generally starts when a person is young and worsens with age. Almost all people are affected to some degree by the age of 65. It is the number one cause of death and disability in developed countries. Though it was first described in 1575, there is evidence suggesting that this disease state is genetically inherent in the broader human population, with its origins tracing back to CMAH genetic mutations that may have occurred more than two million years ago during the evolution of hominin ancestors of modern human beings.

== Signs and symptoms ==
Atherosclerosis is typically asymptomatic for decades because the arteries enlarge at all plaque locations; thus, there is no effect on blood flow. Even most plaque ruptures do not produce symptoms until enough narrowing or closure of an artery, due to clots, occurs. Signs and symptoms only happen after severe narrowing or closure impedes blood flow to different organs enough to induce symptoms. Most of the time, patients realize that they have the disease only when they experience other cardiovascular disorders such as stroke or heart attack. These symptoms, however, still vary depending on which artery or organ is affected.

Early atherosclerotic processes likely begin in childhood. Fibrous and gelatinous lesions have been observed in the coronary arteries of children. Fatty streaks have been observed in the coronary arteries of juveniles. While coronary artery disease is more prevalent in men than women, atherosclerosis of the cerebral arteries and strokes equally affect both sexes.

Marked narrowing in the coronary arteries, which are responsible for bringing oxygenated blood to the heart, can produce symptoms such as chest pain of angina and shortness of breath, sweating, nausea, dizziness or lightheadedness, breathlessness or palpitations. Abnormal heart rhythms called arrhythmias—the heart beating either too slowly or too quickly—are another consequence of ischemia.

Carotid arteries supply blood to the brain and neck. Marked narrowing of the carotid arteries can present with symptoms such as a feeling of weakness; being unable to think straight; difficulty speaking; dizziness; difficulty in walking or standing up straight; blurred vision; numbness of the face, arms, and legs; severe headache; and loss of consciousness. These symptoms are also related to stroke (death of brain cells). Stroke is caused by marked narrowing or blockage of arteries going to the brain; lack of adequate blood supply leads to the death of the cells of the affected tissue.

Peripheral arteries, which supply blood to the legs, arms, and pelvis, also experience marked narrowing due to plaque rupture and clots. Symptoms of the narrowing are pain and numbness in the arms or legs. Another significant location for plaque formation is the renal arteries, which supply blood to the kidneys. Plaque occurrence and accumulation lead to decreased kidney blood flow and chronic kidney disease, which, like in all other areas, is typically asymptomatic until late stages.

In 2004, US data indicated that in ~66% of men and ~47% of women, the first symptom of atherosclerotic cardiovascular disease was a heart attack or sudden cardiac death (defined as death within one hour of onset of the symptom).

Case studies have included autopsies of U.S. soldiers killed in World War II and the Korean War. A much-cited report involved the autopsies of 300 U.S. soldiers killed in Korea. Although the average age of the men was 22.1 years, 77.3 percent had "gross evidence of coronary arteriosclerosis".

== Risk factors ==
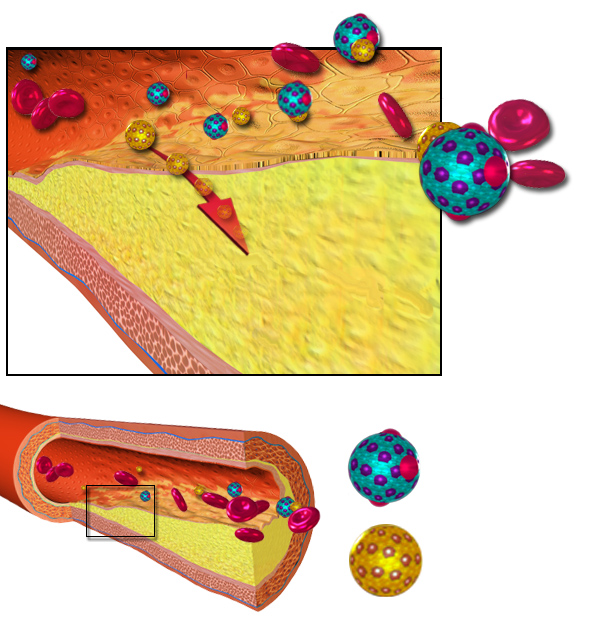
Atherosclerosis and lipoproteins

The atherosclerotic process is not well understood. Atherosclerosis is associated with inflammatory processes in the endothelial cells of the vessel wall associated with retained low-density lipoprotein (LDL) particles. This retention may be a cause, an effect, or both of the underlying inflammatory process.

The presence of the plaque induces the muscle cells of the blood vessel to stretch, compensating for the additional bulk. The endothelial lining then thickens, increasing the separation between the plaque and the lumen. The thickening somewhat offsets the narrowing caused by the plaque's growth. Moreover, it causes the wall to stiffen and become less compliant to stretching with each heartbeat.

=== Modifiable ===
- Western pattern diet
- Abdominal obesity
- Diabetes
- Dyslipidemia
- High blood cholesterol
- High blood pressure
- Elevated concentrations of apolipoprotein B (ApoB)-containing lipoproteins (such as LDL particles), for which LDL-cholesterol (LDL-C) is the most commonly used surrogate marker
- High saturated fat diet
- Trans fat
- Tobacco smoking
- Bacterial infections
- HIV/AIDS
- Psychological stress
- Sedentary lifestyle

=== Nonmodifiable ===
- Biological sex
- South Asian descent
- Advanced age
- Genetic abnormalities
- Family history
- Coronary anatomy and branch pattern

=== Lesser or uncertain ===
- Thrombophilia
- Elevated triglycerides
- Systemic inflammation
- Hyperinsulinemia
- Sleep deprivation
- Air pollution
- Arsenic poisoning
- Hypothyroidism
- Periodontal disease

=== Dietary ===
The relation between dietary fat and atherosclerosis is controversial. The USDA, in its food pyramid, promotes a diet of about 64% carbohydrates from total calories. The American Heart Association, the American Diabetes Association, and the National Cholesterol Education Program make similar recommendations. In contrast, Prof Walter Willett (Harvard School of Public Health, PI of the second Nurses' Health Study) recommends much higher levels of fat, especially of monounsaturated and polyunsaturated fat. These dietary recommendations reach a consensus, though, against consumption of trans fats.

The role of eating oxidized fats (rancid fats) in humans is not clear. Rabbits fed rancid fats develop atherosclerosis faster. Rats fed DHA-containing oils experienced marked disruptions to their antioxidant systems, and accumulated significant amounts of phospholipid hydroperoxide in their blood, livers and kidneys.

Rancid fats and oils taste very unpleasant in even small amounts, so people avoid eating them. Measuring or estimating the actual human consumption of these substances is challenging. Highly unsaturated omega-3 rich oils such as fish oil, when being sold in pill form, can hide the taste of oxidized or rancid fat that might be present. In the US, the health food industry's dietary supplements are self-regulated and outside of FDA regulations. To protect unsaturated fats from oxidation, it is best to keep them cool and in oxygen-free environments.

== Pathophysiology ==
Atherogenesis is the developmental process of atheromatous plaques. It is characterized by arterial remodeling, leading to the subendothelial accumulation of fatty substances called plaques. The buildup of an atheromatous plaque is a slow process, developed over several years through a complex series of cellular events occurring within the arterial wall and in response to several local vascular circulating factors. One recent hypothesis suggests that, for unknown reasons, leukocytes, such as monocytes or basophils, begin to attack the endothelium of the artery lumen in cardiac muscle. The ensuing inflammation leads to the formation of atheromatous plaques in the arterial tunica intima, a region of the vessel wall located between the endothelium and the tunica media.

Chronic inflammation within the arterial wall, driven by immune cells (e.g., macrophages), accelerates atherosclerotic plaque instability by promoting collagen breakdown and thinning the fibrous cap, increasing the likelihood of rupture and thrombosis. The bulk of these lesions is made of excess fat, collagen, and elastin. At first, as the plaques grow, only wall thickening occurs without narrowing. Stenosis is a late event, which may never happen and is often the result of repeated plaque rupture and healing responses, not just the atherosclerotic process. Autopsy studies have shown that the prevalence of coronary artery atherosclerosis in males from the United States, with an average age of 22.1 years, who died in war, ranges from 45% to 77.3%.

=== Cellular ===
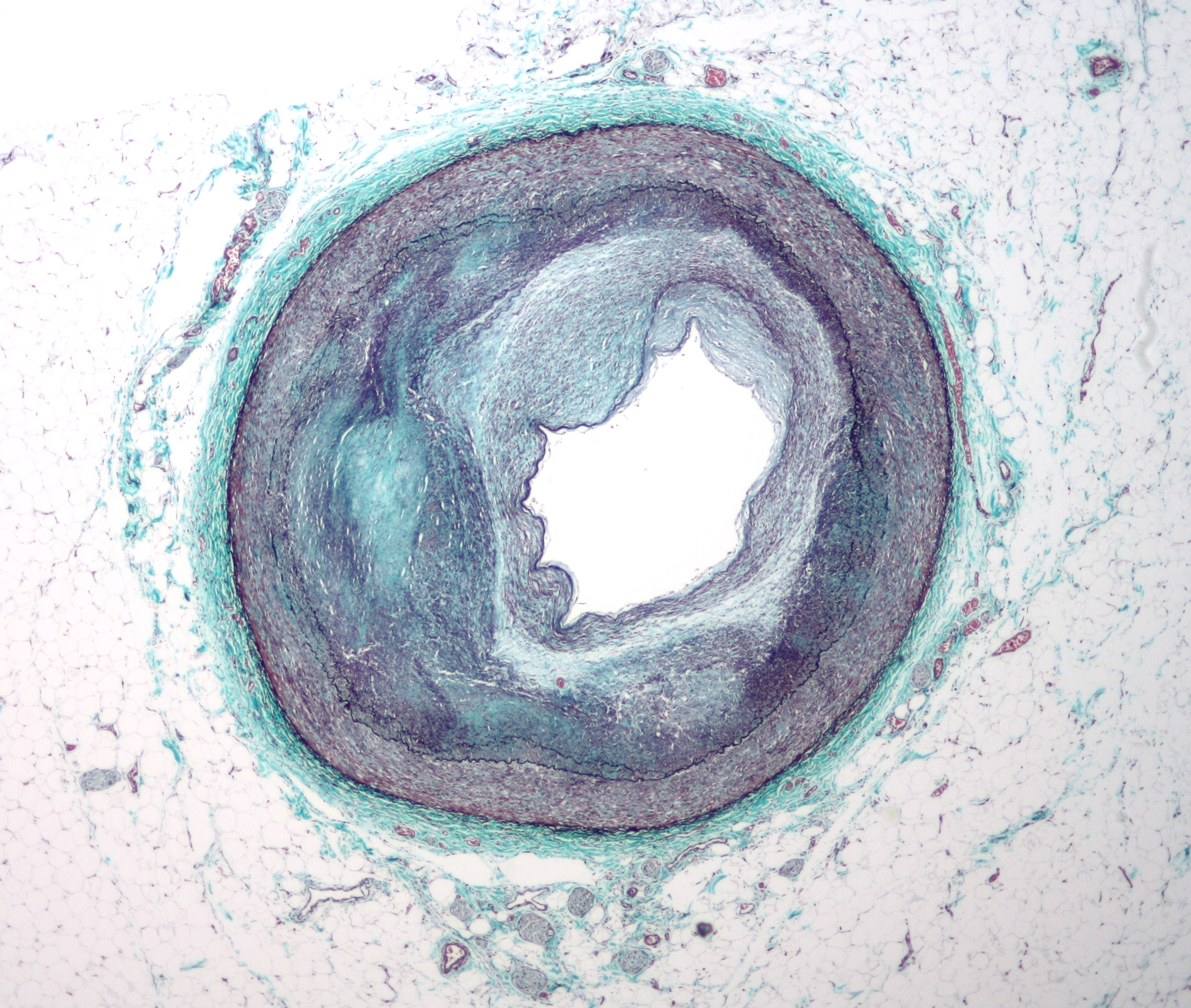
Micrograph of an artery that supplies the heart showing significant atherosclerosis and marked luminal narrowing. Tissue has been stained using Masson's trichrome.

Early atherogenesis is characterized by the adherence of blood circulating monocytes (a type of white blood cell) to the vascular bed lining, the endothelium, then by their migration to the sub-endothelial space, and further activation into monocyte-derived macrophages. The primary documented driver of this process is oxidized lipoprotein particles within the wall, beneath the endothelial cells, though upper normal or elevated concentrations of blood glucose also plays a major role and not all factors are fully understood. Fatty streaks may appear and disappear.

Low-density lipoprotein (LDL) particles in blood plasma invade the endothelium and become oxidized, creating risk of cardiovascular disease. A complex set of biochemical reactions regulates the oxidation of LDL, involving enzymes (such as Lp-LpA2) and free radicals in the endothelium.

Initial damage to the endothelium results in an inflammatory response. Monocytes enter the artery wall from the bloodstream, with platelets adhering to the area of insult. This may be promoted by redox signaling induction of factors such as VCAM-1, which recruits circulating monocytes, and M-CSF, which is selectively required for the differentiation of monocytes into macrophages. The monocytes differentiate into macrophages, which proliferate locally, ingest oxidized LDL, slowly turning into large "foam cells" – so-called because of their changed appearance resulting from the numerous internal cytoplasmic vesicles and resulting high lipid content. Recent evidence has suggested that this macrophage activation may involve a phenomenon known as innate immune memory. Also known as trained immunity, innate immune memory is the innate immune system's ability, upon exposure to oxLDL or other atherogenic stimuli, to undergo epigenetic and metabolic reprogramming, leading to a hyperaugmented immune response following a secondary, non-specific restimulation.

Under the microscope, the lesion now appears as a fatty streak. Foam cells eventually die and further propagate the inflammatory process.

In addition to these cellular activities, there is also smooth muscle proliferation and migration from the tunica media into the intima in response to cytokines secreted by damaged endothelial cells. This leads to the formation of a fibrous capsule covering the fatty streak. Intact endothelium can prevent this smooth muscle proliferation by releasing nitric oxide.

=== Calcification and lipids ===
Calcification forms among vascular smooth muscle cells of the surrounding muscular layer, specifically in the muscle cells adjacent to atheromas and on the surface of atheroma plaques and tissue. In time, as cells die, this leads to extracellular calcium deposits between the muscular wall and outer portion of the atheromatous plaques. With the atheromatous plaque interfering with the regulation of calcium deposition, it accumulates and crystallizes. A similar form of intramural calcification, presenting the picture of an early phase of arteriosclerosis, appears to be induced by many drugs with an antiproliferative mechanism of action (Rainer Liedtke 2008).

Cholesterol is delivered into the vessel wall by cholesterol-containing low-density lipoprotein (LDL) particles. To attract and stimulate macrophages, the cholesterol must be released from the LDL particles and oxidized, a key step in the ongoing inflammatory process. The process is worsened if there is insufficient high-density lipoprotein (HDL), the lipoprotein particle that removes cholesterol from tissues and carries it back to the liver.

The foam cells and platelets encourage the migration and proliferation of smooth muscle cells, which in turn ingest lipids, become replaced by collagen, and transform into foam cells themselves. A protective fibrous cap normally forms between the fatty deposits and the artery lining (the intima).

These capped fatty deposits (now called 'atheromas') produce enzymes that cause the artery to enlarge over time. As long as the artery enlarges sufficiently to compensate for the extra thickness of the atheroma, then no narrowing ("stenosis") of the opening ("lumen") occurs. The artery expands with an egg-shaped cross-section, still with a circular opening. If the enlargement is beyond proportion to the atheroma thickness, then an aneurysm is created.

=== Visible features ===
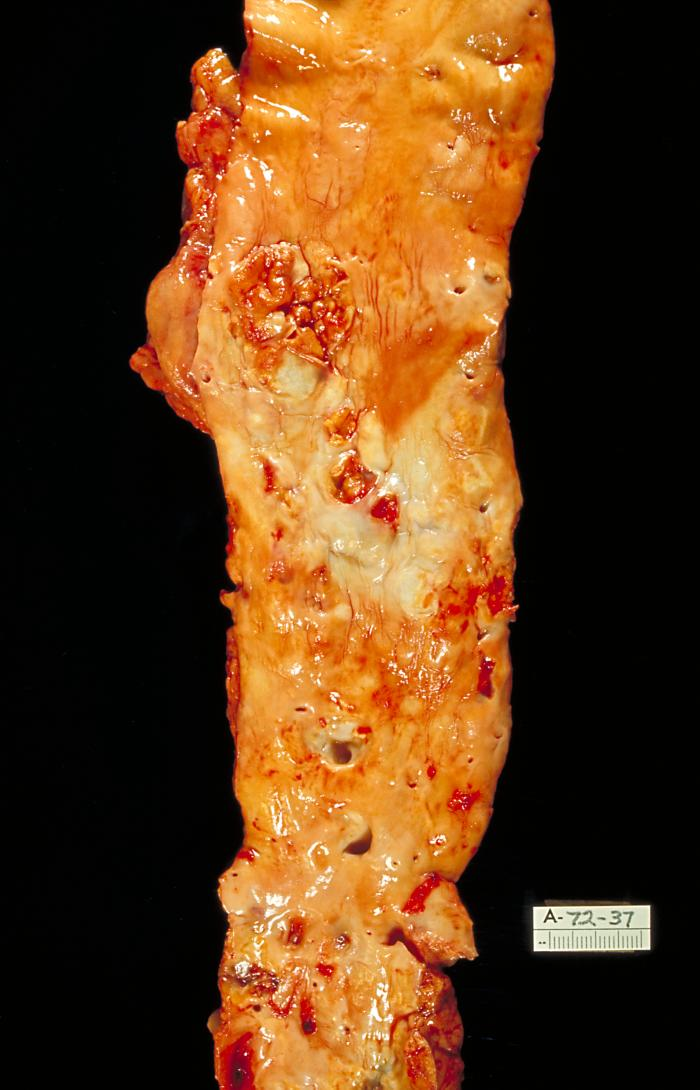
Severe atherosclerosis of the aorta. Autopsy specimen.

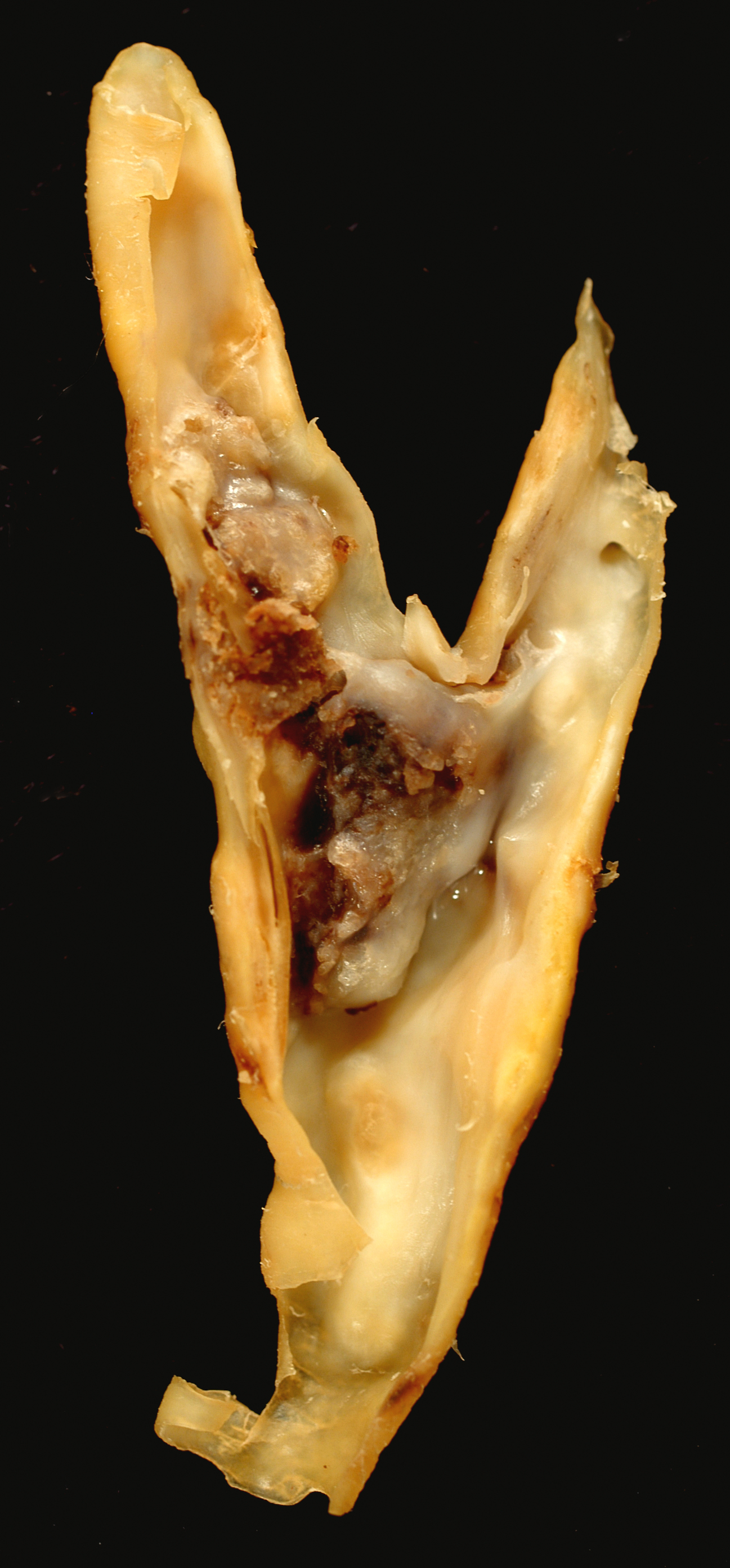
Atherosclerotic plaque from a carotid endarterectomy specimen. This shows the division of the common into the internal and external carotid arteries.

Although arteries are not typically studied microscopically, two plaque types can be distinguished:

1. The fibro-lipid (fibro-fatty) plaque is characterized by an accumulation of lipid-laden cells underneath the intima of the arteries, typically without narrowing the lumen due to compensatory expansion of the bounding muscular layer of the artery wall. Beneath the endothelium, there is a "fibrous cap" covering the atheromatous "core" of the plaque. The core consists of lipid-laden cells (macrophages and smooth muscle cells) with elevated tissue cholesterol and cholesterol ester content, fibrin, proteoglycans, collagen, elastin, and cellular debris. In advanced plaques, the central core usually contains extracellular cholesterol deposits (released from dead cells), which form areas of cholesterol crystals with empty, needle-like clefts. At the periphery of the plaque are younger "foamy" cells and capillaries. These plaques usually produce the most damage to the individual when they rupture. Cholesterol crystals may also play a role.
2. The fibrous plaque is also localized under the intima, within the arterial wall, resulting in thickening and expansion of the wall and, sometimes, spotty localized narrowing of the lumen with some atrophy of the muscular layer. The fibrous plaque contains collagen fibers (eosinophilic), precipitates of calcium (hematoxylinophilic), and, rarely, lipid-laden cells.

In effect, the muscular portion of the artery wall forms small aneurysms just large enough to hold the atheroma that are present. The muscular portion of arterial walls usually remains strong, even after remodeling to compensate for the atheromatous plaques.

However, atheromas within the vessel wall are soft and fragile with little elasticity. Arteries constantly expand and contract with each heartbeat, i.e., the pulse. In addition, calcification deposits between the outer portion of the atheroma and the muscular wall, as they progress, lead to a loss of elasticity and stiffening of the artery as a whole.

The calcification deposits, after they have become sufficiently advanced, are partially visible on coronary artery computed tomography or electron beam tomography (EBT) as rings of increased radiographic density, forming halos around the outer edges of the atheromatous plaques, within the artery wall. On CT, >130 units on the Hounsfield scale (some argue for 90 units) has been the radiographic density usually accepted as clearly representing tissue calcification within arteries. These deposits demonstrate unequivocal evidence of the disease, relatively advanced, even though the lumen of the artery is often still normal by angiography.

=== Rupture and stenosis ===
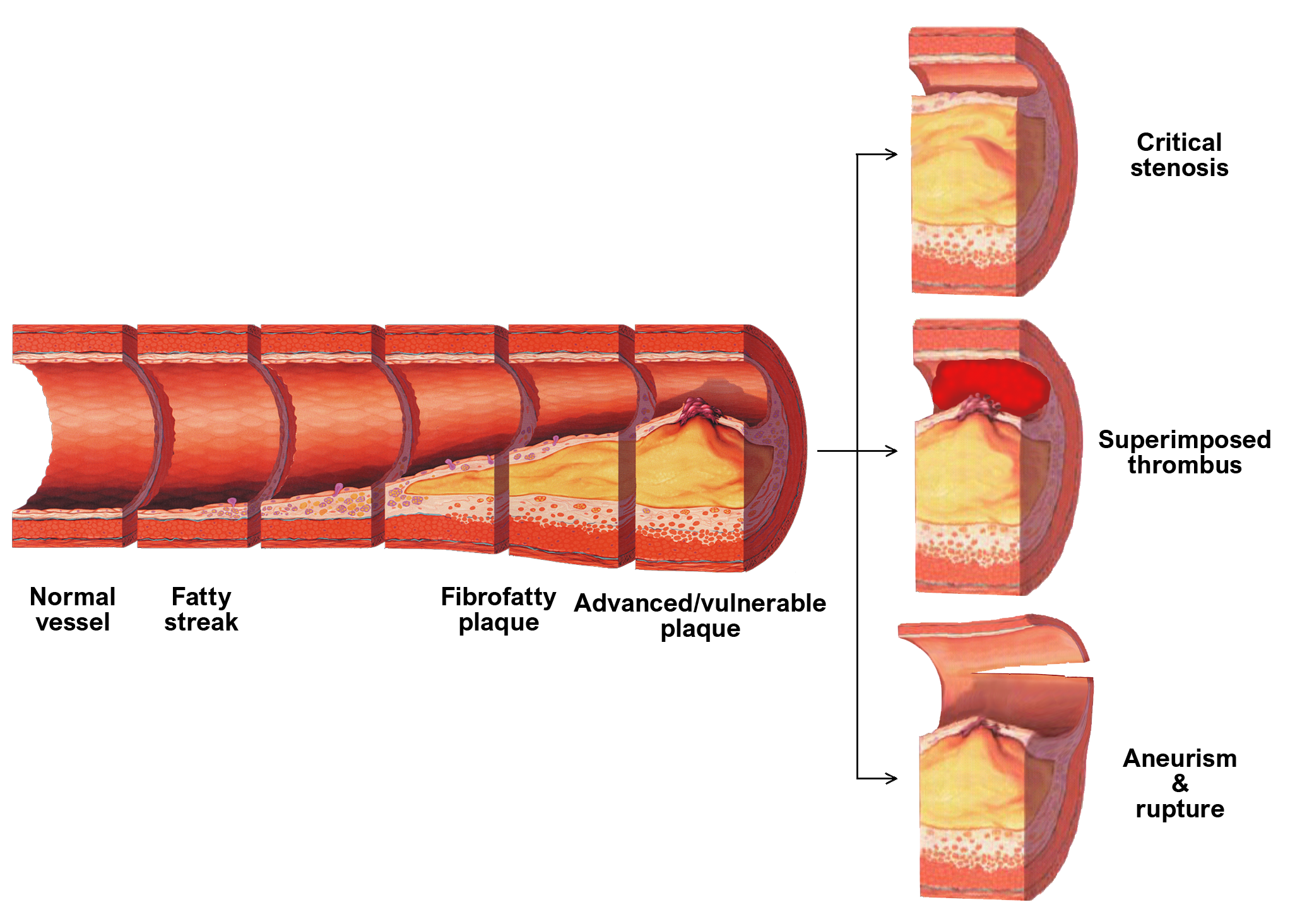
Progression of atherosclerosis to late complications

Although the disease process tends to be slowly progressive over decades, it usually remains asymptomatic until an atheroma ulcerates, leading to immediate blood clotting at the site of the atheroma ulcer. This triggers a cascade of events that leads to clot enlargement, which may quickly obstruct blood flow. A complete blockage leads to ischemia of the myocardial (heart) muscle and damage. This process is the myocardial infarction or "heart attack".

If the heart attack is not fatal, fibrous organization of the clot within the lumen ensues, covering the rupture but also producing stenosis or closure of the lumen, or over time and after repeated ruptures, resulting in a persistent, usually localized stenosis or blockage of the artery lumen. Stenoses can be slowly progressive, whereas plaque ulceration is a sudden event that occurs specifically in atheromas with thinner/weaker fibrous caps that have become "unstable".

Repeated plaque ruptures, ones not resulting in total lumen closure, combined with the clot patch over the rupture and healing response to stabilize the clot, are the process that produces most stenoses over time. The stenotic areas often become more stable despite increased flow velocities at these narrowings. Most major blood-flow-stopping events occur at large plaques, which, before their rupture, produced little, if any, stenosis.

From clinical trials, 20% is the average stenosis at plaques that subsequently rupture, with resulting complete artery closure. Most severe clinical events do not occur at plaques that produce high-grade stenosis. From clinical trials, only 14% of heart attacks occur from artery closure at plaques producing 75% or greater stenosis before the vessel closing.

If the fibrous cap separating a soft atheroma from the bloodstream within the artery ruptures, tissue fragments are exposed and released. These tissue fragments are very clot-promoting, containing collagen and tissue factor; they activate platelets and activate the system of coagulation. The result is the formation of a thrombus (blood clot) overlying the atheroma, which obstructs blood flow acutely. With the obstruction of blood flow, downstream tissues are starved of oxygen and nutrients. If this is the myocardium (heart muscle) angina (cardiac chest pain) or myocardial infarction (heart attack) develops.

=== Accelerated growth of plaques ===
The progression of atherosclerosis (narrowing exaggerated)

The distribution of atherosclerotic plaques in a part of the arterial endothelium is inhomogeneous. The multiple and focal development of atherosclerotic changes is similar to that of amyloid plaques in the brain and age spots on the skin. Misrepair-accumulation aging theory suggests that misrepair mechanisms play an important role in the focal development of atherosclerosis. The development of a plaque is a result of the repair of the injured endothelium. Because of the infusion of lipids into the sub-endothelium, the repair has to end up with altered remodeling of the local endothelium. This is the manifestation of a misrepair. This altered remodeling increases the susceptibility of the local endothelium to damage and reduces its repair efficiency. Consequently, this part of the endothelium has an increased risk of being injured and improperly repaired. Thus, the accumulation of misrepairs of the endothelium is focalized and self-accelerating. In this way, the growth of a plaque is also self-accelerating. Within a part of the arterial wall, the oldest plaque is always the biggest and is the most dangerous one to cause blockage of a local artery.

=== Components ===
The plaque is divided into three distinct components:

1. The atheroma ("lump of gruel", from Greek ἀθήρα (athera) 'gruel'), which is the nodular accumulation of a soft, flaky, yellowish material at the center of large plaques, composed of macrophages nearest the lumen of the artery
2. Underlying areas of cholesterol crystals
3. Calcification at the outer base of older or more advanced lesions. Atherosclerotic lesions, or atherosclerotic plaques, are separated into two broad categories: Stable and unstable (also called vulnerable). The pathobiology of atherosclerotic lesions is very complicated, but generally, stable atherosclerotic plaques, which tend to be asymptomatic, are rich in extracellular matrix and smooth muscle cells. On the other hand, unstable plaques are rich in macrophages and foam cells, and the extracellular matrix separating the lesion from the arterial lumen (also known as the fibrous cap) is usually weak and prone to rupture. Ruptures of the fibrous cap expose thrombogenic material, such as collagen, to the circulation and eventually induce thrombus formation in the lumen. Upon formation, intraluminal thrombi can occlude arteries outright (e.g., coronary occlusion), but more often they detach, move into the circulation, and eventually occlude smaller downstream branches, causing thromboembolism.

Apart from thromboembolism, chronically expanding atherosclerotic lesions can cause complete closure of the lumen. Chronically expanding lesions are often asymptomatic until the lumen stenosis is so severe (usually over 80%) that blood supply to downstream tissue(s) is insufficient, resulting in ischemia. These complications of advanced atherosclerosis are chronic, slowly progressive, and cumulative. Most commonly, soft plaque suddenly ruptures (see vulnerable plaque), causing the formation of a thrombus that will rapidly slow or stop blood flow, leading to the death of the tissues fed by the artery in approximately five minutes. This event is called an infarction.

== Diagnosis ==
CT image of atherosclerosis of the abdominal aorta. A woman of 70 years old with hypertension and dyslipidemia.

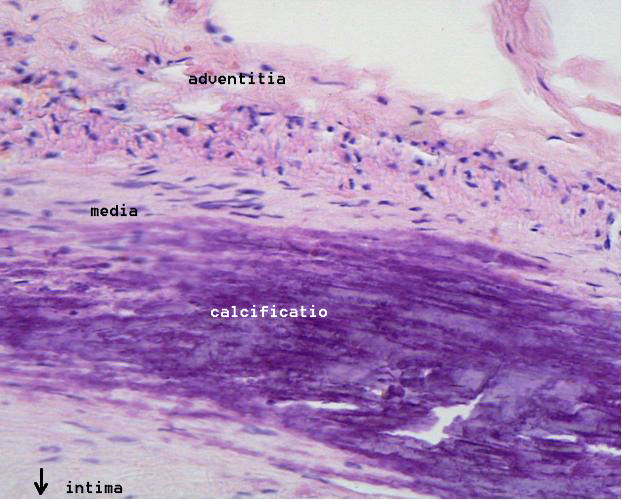
Microphotography of arterial wall with calcified (violet color) atherosclerotic plaque (hematoxylin and eosin stain)

Areas of severe narrowing, stenosis, detectable by angiography, and to a lesser extent "stress testing" have long been the focus of human diagnostic techniques for cardiovascular disease, in general. However, these methods focus on detecting only severe narrowing, not the underlying atherosclerotic disease. As demonstrated by human clinical studies, most severe events occur in locations with heavy plaque, yet little or no lumen narrowing present before debilitating events suddenly occur. Plaque rupture can lead to artery lumen occlusion within seconds to minutes, potentially permanent disability, and sometimes sudden death.

Plaques that have ruptured are known as complicated lesions. The extracellular matrix of the lesion breaks, usually at the shoulder of the fibrous cap that separates the lesion from the arterial lumen, where the exposed thrombogenic components of the plaque, mainly collagen, will trigger thrombus formation. The thrombus then travels downstream to other blood vessels, where the blood clot may partially or completely block blood flow. If the blood flow is completely blocked, cell death occurs due to the lack of oxygen supply to nearby cells, resulting in necrosis. The narrowing or obstruction of blood flow can occur in any artery within the body. Obstruction of arteries supplying the heart muscle results in a heart attack, while the obstruction of arteries supplying the brain results in an ischaemic stroke.

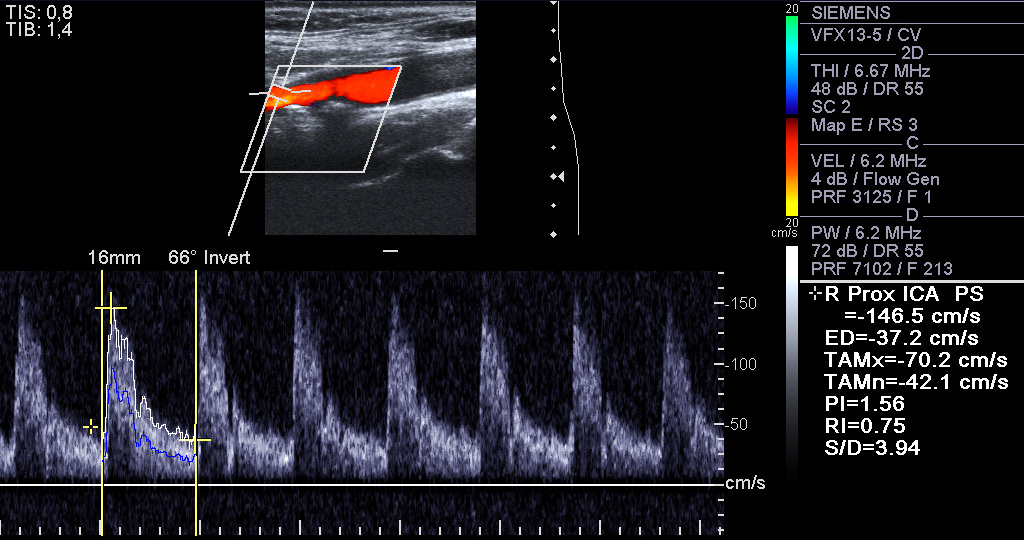
Doppler ultrasound of right internal carotid artery with calcified and non-calcified plaques showing less than 70% stenosis

Lumen stenosis that is greater than 75% was considered the hallmark of clinically significant disease in the past because recurring episodes of angina and abnormalities in stress tests are only detectable at that particular severity of stenosis. However, clinical trials have shown that only about 14% of clinically debilitating events occur at sites with more than 75% stenosis. Most cardiovascular events involve the sudden rupture of plaque, but do not display any evident luminal narrowing. Thus, greater attention has been focused on "vulnerable plaque" since the late 1990s.

Besides the traditional diagnostic methods such as angiography and stress testing, other detection techniques have been developed in the past decades for earlier detection of atherosclerotic disease. Some of the detection approaches include anatomical detection and physiological measurement.

Examples of anatomical detection methods include coronary calcium scoring by CT, carotid IMT (intimal media thickness) measurement by ultrasound, and intravascular imaging techniques, such as intravascular ultrasound (IVUS), and intravascular optical coherence tomography (OCT), allowing direct visualization of atherosclerotic plaques.

Other methods include blood measurements, e.g., lipoprotein subclass analysis, HbA1c, hs-CRP, and homocysteine.

Both anatomic and physiologic methods allow early detection before symptoms appear, disease staging, and tracking of disease progression. For biomedical research purposes, atherosclerosis has been defined as the presence of atherosclerotic lesions in the coronary arteries, carotid arteries, cerebral arteries, limb arteries, or other vessels. The definitions of the different histological types of atheromatous plaques are also well-established. In the clinical practice of medicine, as well as in the field of epidemiology, the widely agreed upon diagnostic criteria for atherosclerosis are those for the diseases resulting from atherosclerosis, including atherosclerotic cardiovascular disease and peripheral artery disease.

In recent years, developments in nuclear imaging techniques such as PET and SPECT have provided non-invasive methods of estimating the severity of atherosclerotic plaques.

== Prevention ==
Up to 90% of cardiovascular disease may be preventable if established risk factors are avoided. Medical management of atherosclerosis first involves modification to risk factors–for example, via smoking cessation and diet restrictions. Prevention is generally achieved by eating a healthy diet, exercising, maintaining a normal weight, and not smoking.

=== Diet ===
Changes in diet may help prevent the development of atherosclerosis. Tentative evidence suggests that a diet containing dairy products has no effect on or decreases the risk of cardiovascular disease.

A diet rich in fruits and vegetables lowers the risk of cardiovascular disease and death. Evidence suggests that the Mediterranean diet may improve cardiovascular results. There is also evidence that a Mediterranean diet may be better than a low-fat diet in bringing about long-term changes to cardiovascular risk factors (e.g., lower cholesterol level and blood pressure). A 2024 review highlighted that bioactive compounds found in Mediterranean diet components (such as olive, grape, garlic, rosemary, and saffron) exhibit properties that may contribute to cardiovascular health and atherosclerosis prevention.

=== Exercise ===
A controlled exercise program combats atherosclerosis by improving the circulation and blood vessel functionality. Exercise is also used to manage weight in patients who are obese, lower blood pressure, and decrease cholesterol. Often, lifestyle modification is combined with medication therapy. For example, statins help to lower cholesterol. Antiplatelet medications like aspirin help to prevent clots, and a variety of antihypertensive medications are routinely used to control blood pressure. If the combined efforts of risk factor modification and medication therapy are not sufficient to control symptoms or fight imminent threats of ischemic events, a physician may resort to interventional or surgical procedures to correct the obstruction.

== Treatment ==
Treatment of established disease may include medications to lower cholesterol, such as statins, blood pressure medication, or medications that decrease clotting, such as aspirin. GLP-1 RAs may be used if the established ASCVD patient has obesity or overweight and/or type 2 diabetes. Many procedures may also be carried out such as percutaneous coronary intervention, coronary artery bypass graft, or carotid endarterectomy.

Medical treatments often focus on alleviating symptoms. However, measures that focus on reducing underlying atherosclerosis, rather than simply treating symptoms, are more effective. Non-pharmaceutical means are usually the first method of treatment, such as stopping smoking, eating a low-fat diet, and practicing regular exercise. If these methods do not work, medicines are usually the next step in treating cardiovascular diseases and, with improvements, have increasingly become the most effective method over the long term.

The key to more effective approaches is to combine different treatment strategies. In addition, for those approaches, such as lipoprotein transport behaviors, which have been shown to produce the most success, adopting more aggressive combination treatment strategies taken daily and indefinitely has generally produced better results, both before and especially after people are symptomatic.

=== Statins ===
Statin medications are widely prescribed for treating atherosclerosis. They have shown benefit in reducing cardiovascular disease and mortality in those with high cholesterol with few side effects. Secondary prevention therapy, which includes high-intensity statins and aspirin, is recommended by multi-society guidelines for all patients with a history of ASCVD (atherosclerotic cardiovascular disease) to prevent the recurrence of coronary artery disease, ischemic stroke, or peripheral arterial disease. However, prescription of and adherence to these guideline-concordant therapies is lacking, particularly among young patients and women.

Statins work by inhibiting HMG-CoA (hydroxymethylglutaryl-coenzyme A) reductase, a hepatic rate-limiting enzyme in cholesterol's biochemical production pathway. Inhibiting this rate-limiting enzyme reduces the body's ability to produce cholesterol endogenously, thereby reducing LDL-cholesterol levels in the blood. This reduced endogenous cholesterol production triggers the body to pull cholesterol from other cellular sources, enhancing serum HDL-cholesterol. These data are primarily in middle-aged men; the conclusions are less clear for women or for people over the age of 70.

GLP-1 RAs

GLP-1 receptor agonists have demonstrated cardiovascular benefits in patients with established atherosclerotic cardiovascular disease (ASCVD), particularly those with type 2 diabetes and/or overweight or obesity. Certain medications in this class, including semaglutide, liraglutide, and dulaglutide, have demonstrated reductions in major adverse cardiovascular events, including nonfatal myocardial infarction, nonfatal stroke, and cardiovascular death.

In the SELECT trial, semaglutide reduced the relative risk of major adverse cardiovascular events by 20% in adults with overweight or obesity and established cardiovascular disease without diabetes, compared with placebo. GLP-1-based therapies may reduce cardiovascular risk through improvements in body weight, blood pressure, glycemic control, and other cardiometabolic factors. Their cardiovascular benefits may also extend beyond their effects on weight reduction.

These medications are used to reduce cardiovascular risk in eligible populations but are not established treatments for directly removing atherosclerotic plaque. Lipid-lowering medications, particularly statins, remain central to atherosclerosis management.

=== Surgery ===
When atherosclerosis has become severe and caused irreversible ischemia, such as tissue loss in the case of peripheral artery disease, surgery may be indicated. Vascular bypass surgery can re-establish flow around the diseased segment of the artery, and angioplasty with or without stenting can reopen narrowed arteries and improve blood flow. Coronary artery bypass grafting without manipulation of the ascending aorta has demonstrated reduced rates of postoperative stroke and mortality compared to traditional on-pump coronary revascularization. Atherectomy, which involves the removal of plaques instead of pushing them into the vessel wall, is a minimally invasive alternative to angioplasty.

=== Other ===
There is evidence that some anticoagulants, particularly warfarin, which inhibit clot formation by interfering with Vitamin K metabolism, may promote arterial calcification in the long term despite reducing clot formation in the short term. Also, small molecules such as 3-hydroxybenzaldehyde and protocatechuic aldehyde have shown vasculoprotective effects to reduce risk of atherosclerosis.

== Epidemiology ==
Cardiovascular disease, which is predominantly the clinical manifestation of atherosclerosis, is one of the leading causes of death worldwide.

Almost all children older than age 10 in developed countries have aortic fatty streaks, with coronary fatty streaks beginning in adolescence.

In 1953, a study was published that examined the results of 300 autopsies performed on U.S. soldiers who had died in the Korean War. Despite the average age of the soldiers being just 22 years old, 77% of them had visible signs of coronary atherosclerosis. This study showed that heart disease could affect people at a younger age and was not just a problem for older individuals.

In 1992, a report showed that microscopic fatty streaks were found in the left anterior descending artery in over 50% of children aged 10–14, and 8% had even more advanced lesions with more accumulations of extracellular lipid.

A 2005 report of a study from 1985 to 1995 found that around 87% of aortas and 30% of coronary arteries in the age group 5–14 years had fatty streaks, which increased with age.

== Etymology ==
The following terms are similar in both spelling and meaning, and can be easily confused: arteriosclerosis, arteriolosclerosis, and atherosclerosis. Arteriosclerosis is a general term describing any hardening (and loss of elasticity) of medium or large arteries (from Greek ἀρτηρία (artēria) 'artery' and σκλήρωσις (sklerosis) 'hardening'); arteriolosclerosis is any hardening (and loss of elasticity) of arterioles (small arteries); atherosclerosis is a hardening of an artery specifically due to an atheromatous plaque (from Ancient Greek ἀθήρα (athḗra) 'gruel'). The term atherogenic refers to substances or processes that cause the formation of atheroma.

== Economics ==
In 2011, coronary atherosclerosis was one of the top ten most expensive conditions seen during inpatient hospitalizations in the US, with aggregate inpatient hospital costs of $10.4 billion.

== Research ==
=== Lipids ===
An indication of the role of high-density lipoprotein (HDL) on atherosclerosis has been with the rare Apo-A1 Milano human genetic variant of this HDL protein. A small short-term trial using bacterial-synthesized human Apo-A1 Milano HDL in people with unstable angina produced a fairly dramatic reduction in measured coronary plaque volume in only six weeks vs. the usual increase in plaque volume in those randomized to placebo. The trial was published in JAMA in early 2006. Ongoing work starting in the 1990s may lead to human clinical trials—probably by about 2008. These may use synthesized Apo-A1 Milano HDL directly, or they may use gene-transfer methods to pass the ability to synthesize the Apo-A1 Milano HDLipoprotein.

Methods to increase HDL particle concentrations, which in some animal studies largely reverse and remove atheromas, are being developed and researched. However, increasing HDL by any means is not necessarily helpful. For example, the drug torcetrapib is the most effective agent currently known for raising HDL (by up to 60%). However, in clinical trials, it also raised deaths by 60%. All studies regarding this drug were halted in December 2006.

The actions of macrophages drive atherosclerotic plaque progression. Immunomodulation of atherosclerosis is the term for techniques that modulate immune system function to suppress this macrophage action.

Involvement of lipid peroxidation chain reaction in atherogenesis triggered research on the protective role of the heavy isotope (deuterated) polyunsaturated fatty acids (D-PUFAs) that are less prone to oxidation than ordinary PUFAs (H-PUFAs). PUFAs are essential nutrients – they are involved in metabolism in that very form as they are consumed with food. In transgenic mice, a model for human-like lipoprotein metabolism, adding D-PUFAs to the diet reduced body weight gain, improved cholesterol handling, and reduced atherosclerotic damage to the aorta.

=== miRNA ===
MicroRNAs (miRNAs) have complementary sequences in the 3' UTR and 5' UTR of target mRNAs of protein-coding genes, and cause mRNA cleavage or repression of translational machinery. In diseased vascular vessels, miRNAs are dysregulated and highly expressed. miR-33 is found in cardiovascular diseases. It is involved in atherosclerotic initiation and progression including lipid metabolism, insulin signaling and glucose homeostatis, cell type progression and proliferation, and myeloid cell differentiation. They found in rodents that the inhibition of miR-33 raises HDL-C levels, and miR-33 expression is down-regulated in humans with atherosclerotic plaques.

miR-33a and miR-33b are located on intron 16 of human sterol regulatory element-binding protein 2 (SREBP2) gene on chromosome 22 and intron 17 of SREBP1 gene on chromosome 17. miR-33a/b regulates cholesterol/lipid homeostasis by binding in the 3'UTRs of genes involved in cholesterol transport, such as ATP binding cassette (ABC) transporters, and enhances or represses their expression. Studies have shown that ABCA1 mediates cholesterol transport from peripheral tissues to Apolipoprotein-1. It is also important in the reverse cholesterol transport pathway, where cholesterol is delivered from peripheral tissue to the liver, where it can be excreted into bile or converted to bile acids before excretion. Therefore, ABCA1 prevents cholesterol accumulation in macrophages. By enhancing miR-33 function, ABCA1 levels decrease, leading to decreased cellular cholesterol efflux to apoA-1. On the other hand, by inhibiting miR-33 function, the level of ABCA1 is increased, which increases the cholesterol efflux to apoA-1. Suppression of miR-33 will lead to less cellular cholesterol and higher plasma HDL level through the regulation of ABCA1 expression.

=== DNA damage ===
Aging is the most important risk factor for cardiovascular problems. The causative basis by which aging mediates its impact, independently of other recognized risk factors, remains to be determined. Evidence has been reviewed for the key role of DNA damage in vascular aging. 8-oxoG, a common type of oxidative damage in DNA, is found to accumulate in plaque vascular smooth muscle cells, macrophages and endothelial cells, thus linking DNA damage to plaque formation. DNA strand breaks also increased in atherosclerotic plaques. Werner syndrome (WS) is a premature aging condition in humans. WS is caused by a genetic defect in a RecQ helicase that is employed in several repair processes that remove damage from DNA. WS patients develop a considerable burden of atherosclerotic plaques in their coronary arteries and aorta: calcification of the aortic valve is also frequently observed. These findings link excessive unrepaired DNA damage to premature aging and early atherosclerotic plaque development (see DNA damage theory of aging).

=== Microorganisms ===
The microbiota – all the microorganisms in the body- can contribute to atherosclerosis in many ways: modulation of the immune system, changes in metabolism, processing of nutrients, and production of certain metabolites that can get into blood circulation. One such metabolite, produced by gut bacteria, is trimethylamine N-oxide (TMAO). Its levels have been associated with atherosclerosis in human studies, and animal research suggests a possible causal relation. An association between the bacterial genes encoding trimethylamine lyases — the enzymes involved in TMAO generation — and atherosclerosis has been noted.

=== Vascular smooth muscle cells ===
Vascular smooth muscle cells play a crucial role in atherogenesis and were historically considered to be beneficial for plaque stability by forming a protective fibrous cap and synthesizing strength-giving extracellular matrix components. However, in addition to the fibrous cap, vascular smooth muscle cells also give rise to many of the cell types found within the plaque core and can modulate their phenotype to both promote and reduce plaque stability. Vascular smooth muscle cells exhibit pronounced plasticity within atherosclerotic plaque and can modify their gene expression profile to resemble various other cell types, including macrophages, myofibroblasts, mesenchymal stem cells and osteochondrocytes. Importantly, genetic lineage-tracing experiments have unequivocally shown that 40-90% of plaque-resident cells are vascular smooth muscle cell-derived, therefore, it is important to research the role of vascular smooth muscle cells in atherosclerosis to identify new therapeutic targets.

=== Treatment research ===
The sugar cyclodextrin (CD) removed cholesterol that had built up in the arteries of mice fed a high-fat diet. CD is absorbed into the mouse bloodstream. It increases the production of oxysterols in macrophages and plaques, which causes the activation of LXR in macrophages. This, in turn, causes the macrophages to be more capable of cholesterol efflux and makes them more anti-inflammatory.

=== Presence in other species ===
Atherosclerosis primarily affects herbivorous species. Carnivorous animals such as dogs, cats, lions, and tigers can consume diets high in saturated fat and cholesterol without developing atherosclerotic plaques, as demonstrated in various studies. Atherosclerosis can be experimentally induced in carnivorous animals only by thyroidectomy. Removal of the thyroid gland appears to alter lipid metabolism, rendering saturated fat and cholesterol atherogenic in these species, similar to the effect observed in herbivores.

== See also ==
- Aging-associated diseases
- Arterial stiffness
- Advanced glycation end-product
- Complications of hypertension
- List of circulatory system conditions
