= Fibrous cap =

Layer found in atheromatous plaques

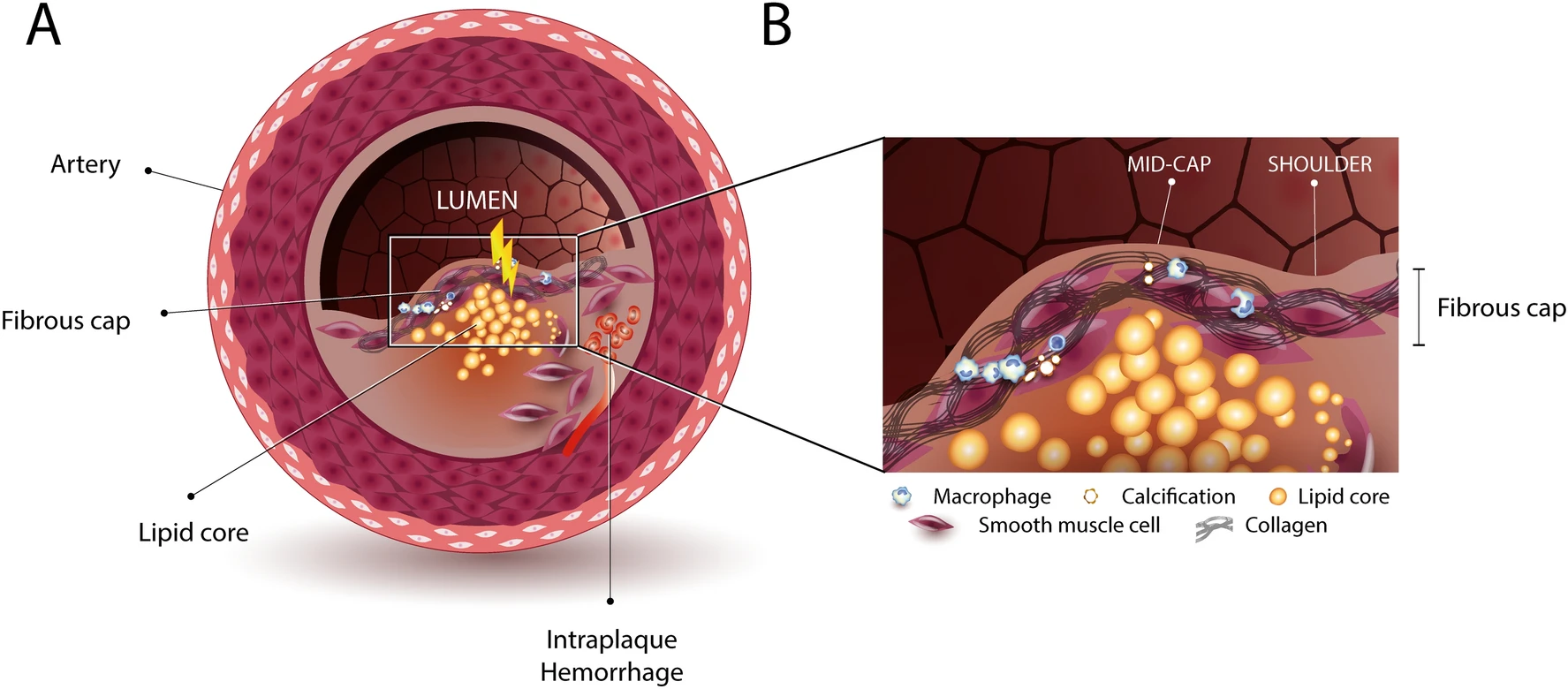
Fibrous cap in an atheromatous plaque

The fibrous cap is a layer of fibrous connective tissue, which is thicker and less cellular than the normal intima, found in atheromatous plaques. The fibrous cap contains macrophages and smooth muscle cells. The fibrous cap of an atheroma is composed of bundles of muscle cells, macrophages, foam cells, lymphocytes, collagen and elastin. An atheroma with a cap is termed a fibrous cap atheroma.

== Rupture ==
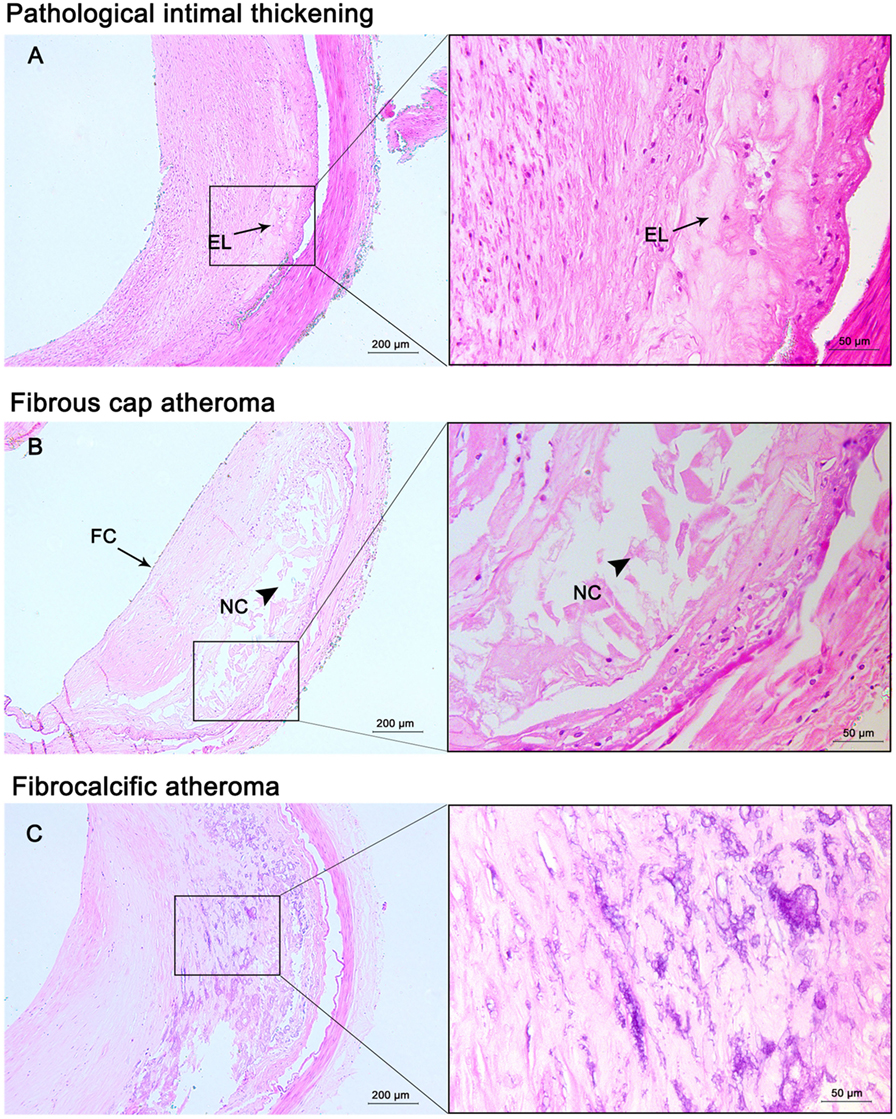
Histopathological progresssion

The rupture of a fibrous cap can lead to a stroke, or a heart attack either of which has the potential to be fatal. The fibrous cap is prone to rupture and ulceration which can lead to thrombosis. In advanced lesions, further complications may arise including calcification of the fibrous cap.
