= Electron beam computed tomography =

Medical diagnostic technology

- Patent illustration showing a cutaway view of an electron beam computerized tomography system. Components are 22. electron gun, 23. electron beam, 24. focus coil, 27. beam bending coil, 28-31. target rings, 14. detector array, 11. scan tube. The electron beam creates x-rays at the target rings, which radiates through the patient to the detector on the opposite end of the scan tube.
- MeSH: D014057
- OPS-301 code: 3-26

Electron beam computed tomography (EBCT) is a fifth generation computed tomography (CT) scanner in which the X-ray tube is not mechanically spun in order to rotate the source of X-ray photons. This different design was explicitly developed to better image heart structures that never stop moving, performing a complete cycle of movement with each heartbeat.

As in conventional CT technology, the X-ray source-point moves along a circle in space around an object to be imaged. In EBCT, the X-ray tube itself is large and stationary, and partially surrounds the imaging circle. Rather than moving the tube itself, electron-beam focal point (and hence the X-ray source point) is rapidly swept along a tungsten anode in the tube, tracing a large circular arc on its inner surface.

The vast majority of CT scanners in clinical use are third generation machines.

== Advantages and disadvantages ==
The principal application advantage of EBT machines, and the reason for the invention, is that because the X-ray source-point is swept electronically, not mechanically, it can be swept with far greater speed.

The major medical application for which this design technology was invented in the 1980s was for imaging the human heart, specifically to detect coronary calcium. The heart never stops moving, and some important structures, such as arteries, move several times their diameter during each heartbeat. Rapid imaging is therefore important to prevent blurring of moving structures during the scan. EBT detection of calcium deposits is accurate, fast and involves lower exposure to ionising radiation than conventional CT. Patients are exposed to radiation for a shorter period as it is faster in creating multiple images of the heart. The most advanced current commercial designs can perform image sweeps in as little as 0.025 seconds. By comparison, the fastest mechanically swept X-ray tube designs require about 0.25 seconds to perform an image sweep. For reference, current coronary artery angiography imaging is usually performed at 30 frames/second or 0.033 seconds/frame; EBT is far closer to this than mechanically swept CT machines.

Signal-to-noise ratio and spatial resolution are also worse compared to conventional CT.

== Design specifics ==
Electron beam CT scanners are considered a fifth generation CT scanner, with first generation being the pencil beam with translation and rotation, second generation being a fan beam with similar motion to its predecessor, third generation having both rotating fan beam and detectors and fourth generation being a fan beam with a rotating movement but fixed detector. The vast majority of CT scanners in clinical usage are third-generation scanners.

As in standard X-ray tubes, part of the electron current energy when hitting the tungsten target is converted into photons. However, instead of spinning a small target anode in order to dissipate waste heat, the electron current focal spot is swept along a large stationary target anode.

The electron current sweep is aimed using wound copper coil magnetic deflection yokes, as in a cathode-ray tube (CRT). However, the entire structure of the cathode, deflection yokes, anode and overall vacuum tube size is much larger, therefore made out of steel, not glass, with the main central open midsection of the vacuum tube hollow, leaving room for the scan table and object or person to lie while the scan is performed.

== Future ==
This technology is the fastest generation of CT scanner to date. Third-generation spiral CT designs, especially those with 64 detector rows, 3×360°/sec rotation speeds, and designed for cardiac imaging, are largely replacing the EBT design from a commercial and medical perspective. However, electron beam CT still offers sweep speeds of effectively 50×360°/sec rotation speeds and lower radiation exposure.
