= MiR-33 =

Non-coding RNA in the species Homo sapiens

miR-33a
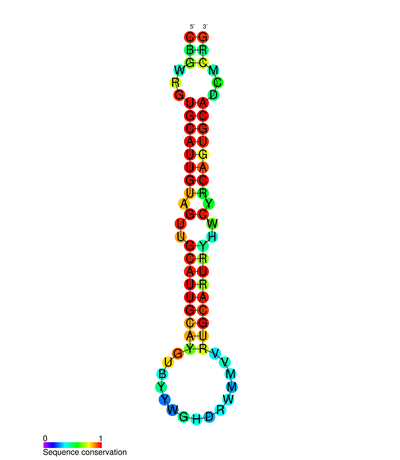
- Conserved secondary structure of miR-33a microRNA precursor

Identifiers
- Symbol: miR-33a
- Alt. Symbols: mir33a
- Rfam: RF00667
- miRBase: MI0000091
- miRBase family: MIPF0000070
- NCBI Gene: 407039
- HGNC: 31634

Other data
- RNA type: miRNA
- Domain(s): Metazoa
- GO: 0035195
- SO: 0001244
- Locus: Chr. 22 q13.2
- PDB structures: PDBe

miR-33b

Identifiers
- Symbol: miR-33b
- Alt. Symbols: mir33b
- Rfam: RF00667
- miRBase: MI0003646
- miRBase family: MIPF0000070
- NCBI Gene: 693120
- HGNC: 32791

Other data
- RNA type: miRNA
- Domain(s): Metazoa
- GO: 0035195
- SO: 0001244
- Locus: Chr. 17 13.2
- PDB structures: PDBe

miR-33 is a family of microRNA precursors, which are processed by the Dicer enzyme to give mature microRNAs. miR-33 is found in several animal species, including humans. In some species there is a single member of this family which gives the mature product mir-33. In humans there are two members of this family called mir-33a and mir-33b, which are located in intronic regions within two protein-coding genes for Sterol regulatory element-binding proteins (SREBP-2 and SREBP-1) respectively.

== Function ==
miR-33 plays a role in lipid metabolism; it downregulates a number of ABC transporters, including ABCA1 and ABCG1, which in turn regulate cholesterol and HDL generation. Further related roles of miR-33 have been proposed in fatty acid degradation and in macrophage response to low-density lipoprotein. It has been suggested that miR-33a and miR-33b regulates genes Involved in fatty acid metabolism and insulin signalling.

Potential binding sites for mir-33 have been identified in the cDNA of tumour suppressor p53. Further, study has shown that miR-33 is able to repress p53 expression and p53-induced apoptosis. This function is thought to be related to hematopoietic stem cell renewal.

== Applications ==
miR-33, along with miR-122, could be used to diagnose or treat conditions related to metabolic disorders and cardiovascular disease.
