= Intima–media thickness =

Measurement of the thickness of artery walls

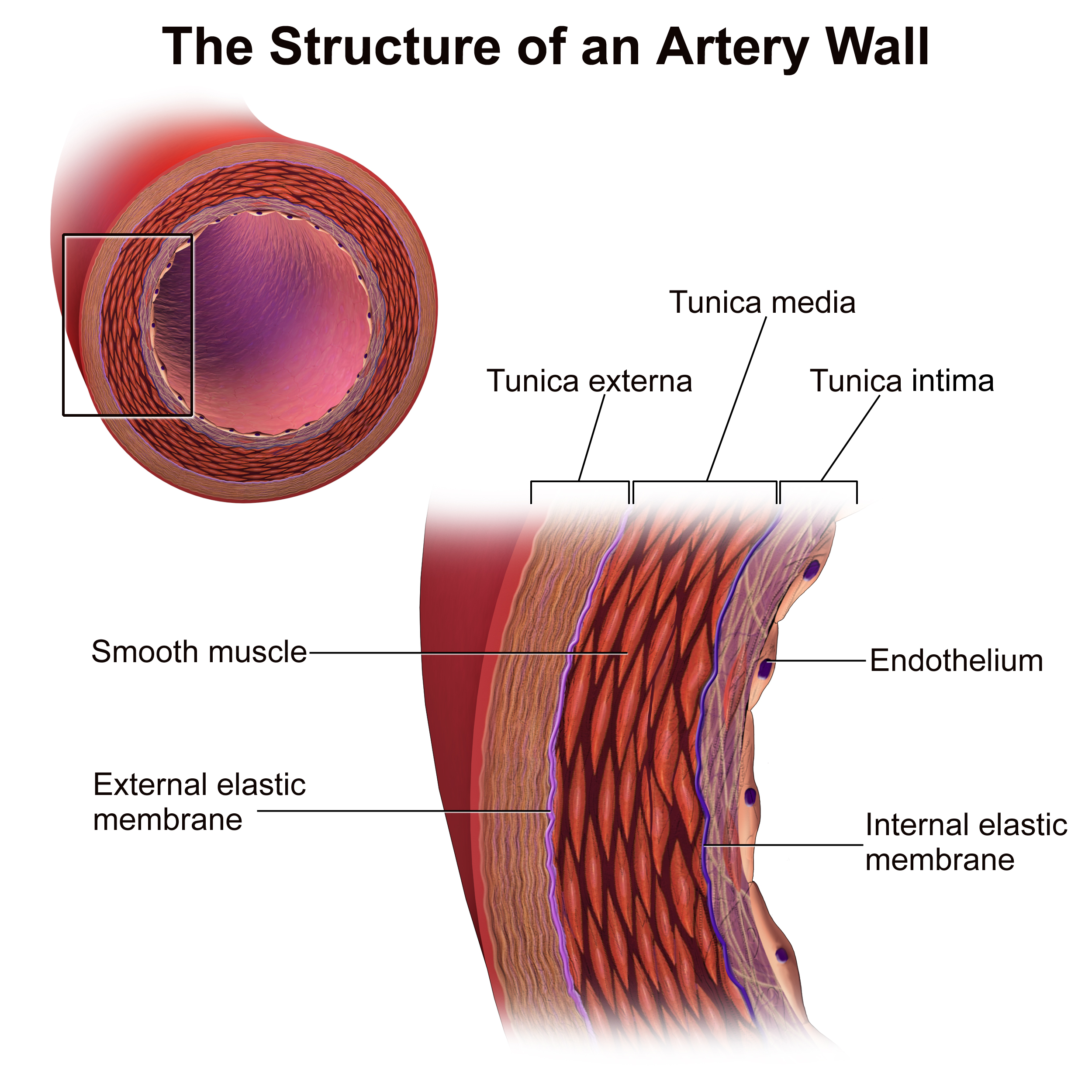

Intima–media thickness (IMT), also called intimal medial thickness, is a measurement of the thickness of tunica intima and tunica media, the innermost two layers of the wall of an artery. The measurement is usually made by external ultrasound and occasionally by internal, invasive ultrasound catheters. Measurements of the total wall thickness of blood vessels can also be done using other imaging modalities.

Carotid IMT is used to detect the presence of atherosclerosis in humans and, more contentiously, to track the regression, arrest or progression of atherosclerosis. Ultrasound measurements of carotid IMT were first proposed and validated in vitro by Paolo Pignoli in 1984 and further details were subsequently published in a highly cited article. The use of IMT as a non-invasive tool to track changes in arterial walls has increased substantially since the mid-1990s. Although carotid IMT is predictive of future cardiovascular events, the usefulness of measuring change in carotid IMT over time is disputed, as meta-analyses have not found that change in carotid IMT is predictive of cardiovascular events. As such, the use of change in carotid IMT as a surrogate endpoint measure of drug efficacy in clinical trials, or in clinical management of cardiovascular disease, is debated.

Carotid IMT is occasionally used in clinical practice, but its role is not clear. After systematically reviewing the evidence base, the United States Preventive Services Task Force found no support for its routine use in stratification of risk for people at intermediate cardiovascular risk. However, in 2003 the European Society of Hypertension–European Society of Cardiology guidelines for the management of arterial hypertension recommended the use of carotid IMT measurements in high-risk patients to help identify target organ damage and in 2010 the American Heart Association and the American College of Cardiology advocated the use of carotid IMT on intermediate risk patients if usual risk classification was not satisfactory.

== Measurement of IMT ==
IMT can be measured using external ultrasound in large arteries relatively close to the skin (e.g. the carotid, brachial, radial, or femoral arteries). External ultrasound methods have the advantage of being non-invasive, comparatively low cost and convenient. Deeper internal arteries, such as the coronary arteries require special intravascular catheters employing ultrasound or optical coherence tomography to measure IMT.

The carotid artery is the usual site of measurement of IMT and consensus statements for carotid IMT have been published for adults and children. Often, carotid IMT is measured in three locations: in the common carotid artery (typically at one cm proximal to the flow divider), at the bifurcation, and in the internal carotid artery. IMT measurements of the far (deeper) wall, by ultrasound, are generally considered more reliable than measurements performed on the near (more superficial) wall; although measurement of both near and far wall IMT has also been advocated.

Carotid IMT has been used in many epidemiological and clinical studies and these have shown associations with several risk factors, including type 2 diabetes, familial hypercholesterolemia, high-density lipoprotein cholesterol (HDL-C), triglycerides, rheumatoid arthritis, non-alcoholic fatty liver disease, and air pollution. Since the 1990s, some clinical trials of lifestyle and pharmaceutical interventions have also used carotid artery IMT as a surrogate endpoint for evaluating the regression and/or progression of atherosclerotic cardiovascular disease; however the appropriateness of carotid IMT in this context is uncertain. Although carotid intima–media thickness is strongly associated with atherosclerosis, thickening of the intima–media may not always be due to atherosclerosis. Intima–medial thickening is a complex process, depending on a variety of factors, including blood pressure, local hemodynamics, shear stress and circumferential tensile stress. Variations in IMT between different locations (e.g. the common carotid artery, the carotid bulb and the internal carotid artery) may reflect differences in local hemodynamic forces.
