= Foam cell =

Fat-laden M2 macrophages seen in atherosclerosis

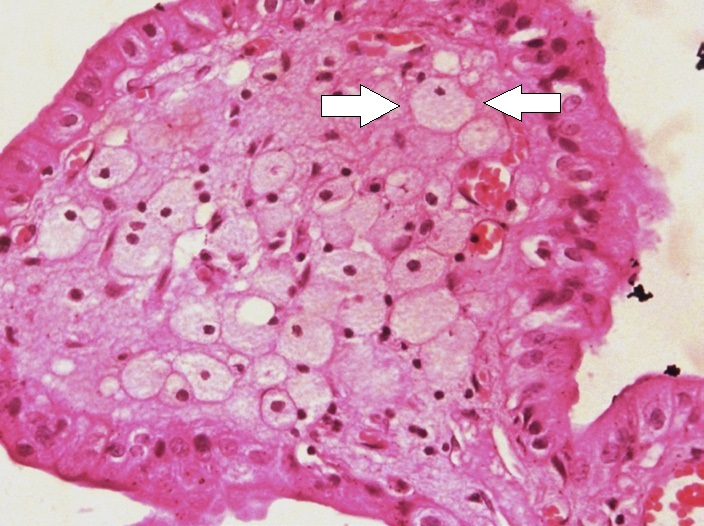
- Foam cells (one indicated by arrows) visible in the finger-like projections into the gallbladder lumen in a case of cholesterolosis

Details
- Precursor: monocyte-derived macrophage

Identifiers
- MeSH: D005487
- FMA: 83586

Foam cells are a type of cell that contain cholesterol. These cells are most commonly discussed in the context of cardiovascular diseases as they can form a plaque that can lead to atherosclerosis and trigger myocardial infarction and stroke.

Foam cells are derived from several cell types including vascular smooth muscle cells (VSMCs), dendritic cells, endothelial cells, and stem cells, but the most-studied foam cells are derived from macrophages and are found in atheromatous plaques. They contain low density lipoproteins (LDL) and can be rapidly detected by examining a fatty plaque under a microscope after it is removed from the body. They are named because the lipoproteins give the cell a foamy appearance.

Despite the connection with cardiovascular diseases they might not be inherently dangerous.

Some foam cells are derived from smooth muscle cells and present a limited macrophage-like phenotype.

== Macrophage-derived foam cells ==
=== Formation ===
Foam cell formation is triggered by a number of factors including the uncontrolled uptake of modified low density lipoproteins (LDL), the upregulation of cholesterol esterification and the impairment of mechanisms associated with cholesterol release. Foam cells are a significant component of atherosclerotic lesions, which are formed when circulating monocyte-derived cells are recruited to the atherosclerotic lesion site or fat deposits in the blood vessel walls. Recruitment is facilitated by the molecules P-selectin and E-selectin, intercellular adhesion molecule 1 (ICAM-1) and vascular cell adhesion molecule 1 (VCAM-1). METTL3 is a gene responsible for mediating N6-methyladenosine RNA methylation, playing a critical role in the regulation of immune and metabolic pathways. METTL3 in macrophages attentuates cholesterol efflux, contributing to atherosclerosis. Upregulated METTL3 expression leads to foam cell formation, as suggested through the reduction of foam cell formation with knockdown of the protein.

In response to the inflammatory recruitment signals, monocytes are able to penetrate the arterial wall through transendothelial migration, as they can even in healthy arteries. Once in the sub endothelium space, inflammation processes induce the differentiation of monocytes into mature macrophages. There are two main subtypes of macrophages, M1 (pro-inflammatory) and M2 (anti-inflammatory). Research surrounding the subtypes that lead to foam cell formation is still debated in current research. Macrophages are then able to internalize modified lipoproteins like βVLDL (beta very low density lipoprotein), AcLDL (acetylated low density lipoprotein) and OxLDL (oxidized low density lipoprotein) through their binding to the scavenger receptors (SRs) such as CD36 and SR-A on the macrophage surface. These scavenger receptors act as pattern recognition receptors (PRRs) on macrophages and are responsible for recognizing and binding to oxLDL, which in turn promotes the formation of foam cells through internalization of these lipoproteins.

Coated-pit endocytosis, phagocytosis and pinocytosis are also responsible for lipoprotein internalization. Once internalized, scavenged lipoproteins are transported to endosomes or lysosomes for degradation, whereby the cholesteryl esters (CE) are hydrolyzed to unesterified free cholesterol (FC) by lysosomal acid lipase (LPL). Free cholesterol is transported to the endoplasmic reticulum where it is re-esterified by ACAT1 (acyl-CoA: cholesterol acyltransferase 1) and subsequently stored as cytoplasmic lipid droplets. These droplets are responsible for the foamy appearance of the macrophage and thus the name of foam cells. At this point, foam cells can either be degraded though the de-esterification and secretion of cholesterol, or can further promote foam cell development and plaque formation – a process that is dependent on the balance of free cholesterol and esterified cholesterol. Recent studies suggested that foam cells have different genetic expression, determining that they could be pro- or anti-inflammatory, TREM2+ lipid-associated macrophages, or Mox (oxidative stress) macrophages, further complicating the idea that they have one singular role, but explaining how they may be more sensitive to particular environments.

The production of foam cells from macrophages and smooth muscle cells may be suppressed through dietary phytosterols, tetracyclic triterpenoids that can reduce inflammation and cholesterol levels.

=== Composition ===
A foam cell is mostly composed of low-density lipoprotein (LDL) cholesterol (LDL-C, commonly referred to as "bad" cholesterol) and modified LDL cholesterols (oxidized, glycated, or acetylated). The uptake of LDL-C alone does not cause foam cell formation; however, the co-internalization of LDL-C with modified LDL in macrophages can result in foam cell development. Modified LDL affects the intracellular trafficking and metabolism of native LDL, such that not all LDL need to be modified for foam cell formation when LDL levels are high.

The maintenance of foam cells and the subsequent progression of plaque build-up is caused by the secretion of chemokines and cytokines from macrophages and foam cells. Foam cells secrete pro-inflammatory cytokines such as interleukins: IL-1, IL-6; tumour necrosis factor (TNF); chemokines: chemokines ligand 2, CCL5, CXC-chemokine ligand 1 (CXCL1); as well as macrophage retention factors. Macrophages within the atherosclerotic legion area have a decreased ability to migrate, which further promotes plaque formation as they are able to secrete cytokines, chemokines, reactive oxygen species (ROS) and growth factors that stimulate modified lipoprotein uptake and vascular smooth muscle cell (VSMC) proliferation. VSMC can also accumulate cholesteryl esters.

In chronic hyperlipidemia, lipoproteins aggregate within the intima of blood vessels and become oxidized by the action of oxygen free radicals generated either by macrophages or endothelial cells. The macrophages engulf oxidized low-density lipoproteins (LDLs) by endocytosis via scavenger receptors, which are distinct from LDL receptors. The oxidized LDL accumulates in the macrophages and other phagocytes, which are then known as foam cells. Foam cells form the fatty streaks of the plaques of atheroma in the tunica intima of arteries.

Foam cells are not dangerous as such, but can become a problem when they accumulate at particular foci thus creating a necrotic centre of atherosclerosis. If the fibrous cap that prevents the necrotic centre from spilling into the lumen of a vessel ruptures, a thrombus can form which can lead to emboli occluding smaller vessels. The occlusion of small vessels results in ischemia, and contributes to stroke and myocardial infarction, two of the leading causes of cardiovascular-related death. However, during the early stages of their pathogenesis, foam cells have also been observed to adopt a pro-fibrotic phenotype in which they increase the stability of a nascent plaque through the up-regulation of the Liver X Receptor (LXR) pathway and the increased expression of extra-cellular matrix (ECM) associated genes.

Foam cells are very small in size and can only be truly detected by examining a fatty plaque under a microscope after it is removed from the body, or more specifically from the heart. Detection usually involves the staining of sections of aortic sinus or artery with Oil Red O (ORO) followed by computer imaging and analysis; or from Nile Red Staining. In addition, fluorescent microscopy or flow cytometry can be used to detect OxLDL uptake when OxLDL has been labeled with 1,1′-dioctadecyl-3,3,3′3′-tetra-methylindocyanide perchlorate (DiI-OxLDL).

=== Degradation ===
Foam cell degradation or more specifically the breakdown of esterified cholesterols, is facilitated by a number of efflux receptors and pathways. Esterified cholesterol from cytoplasmic liquid droplets are once again hydrolyzed to free cholesterol by acid cholesterol esterase. Free cholesterol can then be secreted from the macrophage by the efflux to ApoA1 and ApoE discs via the ABCA1 receptor. This pathway is usually used by modified or pathological lipoproteins like AcLDL, OxLDL and βVLDL. FC can also be transported to a recycling compartment through the efflux to ApoA1 containing HDLs (high density lipoproteins) via aqueous diffusion or transport through the SR-B1 or ABCG1 receptors. While this pathway can also be used by modified lipoproteins, LDL derived cholesterol can only use this pathway to excrete FC. The differences in excretory pathways between types of lipoproteins is mainly a result of the cholesterol being segregated into different areas.

== Infectious diseases ==
Foamy macrophages are also found in diseases caused by pathogens that persist in the body, such as Chlamydia, Toxoplasma, or Mycobacterium tuberculosis. In tuberculosis (TB), bacterial lipids disable macrophages from pumping out excess LDL, causing them to turn into foam cells around the TB granulomas in the lung. The cholesterol forms a rich food source for the bacteria. As the macrophages die, the mass of cholesterol in the center of the granuloma becomes a cheesy substance called caseum. HIV can also cause an increase in differentiation of macrophages into a foam cell phenotype which is linked to the NLRP3 inflammasome and increased levels of cytokines IL-1β and IL-18.

== Other conditions ==
Foam cells may form around leaked silicone from breast implants. Lipid-laden alveolar macrophages, also known as pulmonary foam cells, are seen in bronchoalveolar lavage specimens in some respiratory diseases.

Autoimmunity occurs when the body starts attacking itself. The link between atherosclerosis and autoimmunity is plasmacytoid dendritic cells (pDCs). PDCs contribute to the early stages of the formation of atherosclerotic lesions in the blood vessels by releasing large quantities of type 1 interferons (INF). Stimulation of pDCs leads to an increase of macrophages present in plaques. However, during later stages of lesion progression, pDCs have been shown to have a protective effect by activating T cells and Treg function; leading to disease suppression.
