= Amit Dutt =

Indian academic (born 1973)

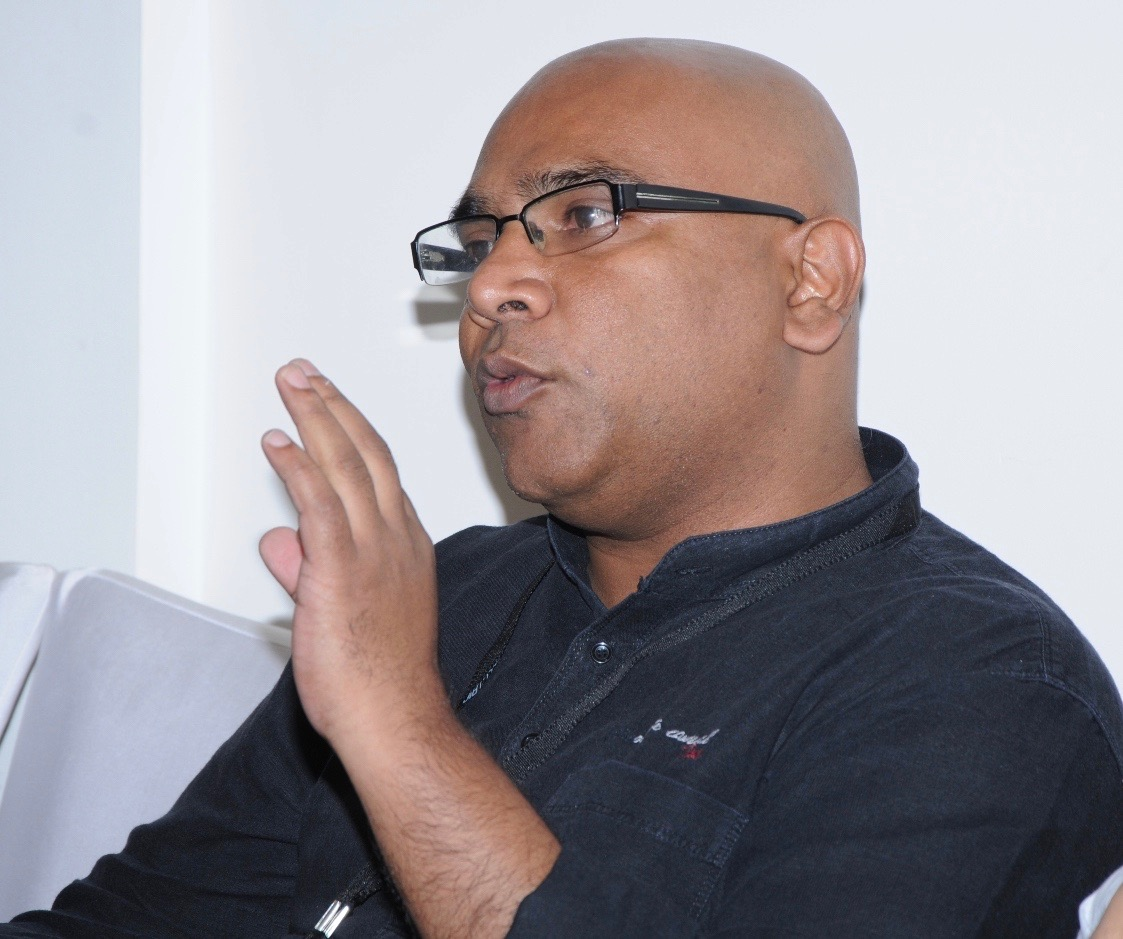
- Born: 6 September 1973 (age 53); Patna, India
- Education: Delhi University; Jamia Millia Islamia; ICGEB; University of Zurich
- Known for: Studies on Fibroblast growth factor receptor
- Awards: 2017 Shanti Swarup Bhatnagar Prize; 2023 DBT- Tata Innovation Fellowship
- Scientific career
- Fields: Cancer genomics
- Workplaces: ICGEB; Zurich University; Broad Institute; Dana–Farber Cancer Institute; ACTREC; University of Delhi South Campus
- Doctoral advisor: Alex Hajnal (ZU); Vanga Siva Reddy (DU); Arif Ali (JMI)

Amit Dutt (born 6 September 1973) is an Indian scientist and geneticist. He is a Professor of Cancer Genetics at the Department of Genetics, University of Delhi South Campus since February 2024, and previously served as the Principal Investigator/ Scientist G at the Advanced Centre for Treatment, Research and Education in Cancer (ACTREC) of Tata Memorial Centre, Mumbai (2010–2024). He holds two doctoral degrees — one in Plant Genetics from ICGEB, New Delhi, and another in Developmental Biology from the Institute of Molecular Life Sciences, University of Zurich, Switzerland — and pursued his postdoctoral research at the Broad Institute of Harvard and MIT and the Dana-Farber Cancer Institute, Boston. His research focuses on cancer genomics and precision oncology, with pioneering contributions to the genomics of epithelial cancers, particularly those prevalent in Indian patients, identifying potential therapeutic targets in lung, tongue, gallbladder, and breast cancers. His lab has also developed widely used computational tools including TMC-SNPdb, HPVDetector, and the Infectious Pathogen Detector, and has expanded into cost-effective liquid biopsy approaches, including fragmentomics and DNA methylation. The Council of Scientific and Industrial Research, the apex agency of the Government of India for scientific research, awarded him the Shanti Swarup Bhatnagar Prize for Science and Technology, one of the highest Indian science awards, for his contributions to medical sciences in 2017. (Note: Long link - please select award year to see details) He is a recipient of several prestigious fellowships and awards, including the Swiss National Science Foundation fellowship, the Ramalingaswami Fellowship, the Wellcome Trust/DBT India Alliance Fellowship, and the DBT Tata Innovation Fellowship, and has accumulated over 11,600 citations for his research contributions.

== Biography ==
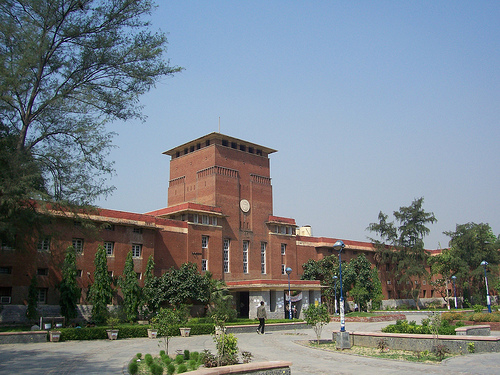
Delhi University

Amit Dutt, born on 6 September 1973 in Patna, capital of the Indian state of Bihar, earned a BSc in botany from Deshbandhu College, Delhi University in 1994 and continued there to complete a post-graduate diploma in Biochemical Technology in 1995 from the Sri Venkateswara College. Moving to Jamia Millia Islamia, he obtained his MSc in 1997 and enrolled for doctoral studies at the Delhi centre of the International Centre for Genetic Engineering and Biotechnology to secure a PhD in Plant Genetics in 2000, guided by Vanga Siva Reddy and Arif Ali of Jamia Millia Islamia. Subsequently, he traveled to the University of Zurich and, working under the guidance of Alex Hajnal at the Institute of Molecular Life Sciences of the university, secured another PhD in Developmental Biology in 2004.

Dutt continued in Zurich to work at the Institute of Neuropathology of the university and in 2005, he moved to join the laboratory of Matthew Meyerson at the Broad Institute of Harvard and MIT as a research associate, working there till 2010 and stationing at the Dana–Farber Cancer Institute, a Harvard Medical School affiliate. On his return to India in October 2010, he joined Tata Memorial Centre at the Advanced Centre for Treatment, Research and Education in Cancer (ACTREC), Navi Mumbai, where he served as the Principal Investigator/ Scientist G and headed the Integrated Cancer Genomics Lab, popularly known as Dutt Lab. He served at ACTREC until 2024, before joining the University of Delhi South Campus as a Professor at the Department of Genetics in February 2024.

== Legacy and honors ==
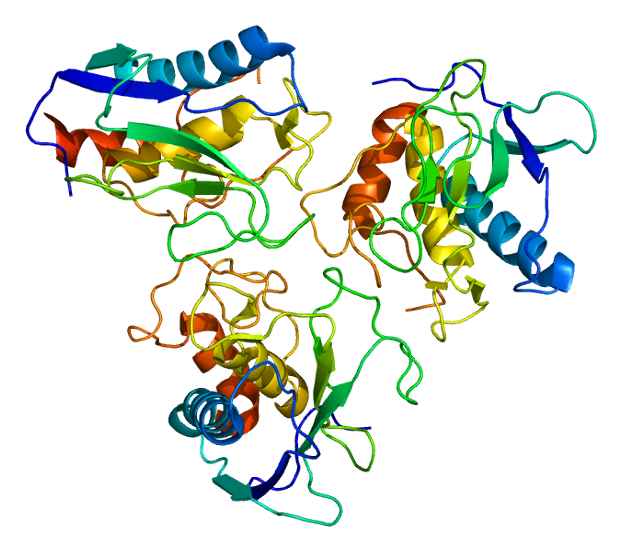
Protein MMP10 PDB 1q3a

Dutt is known to have made significant contributions to the pathobiology and genomics of epithelial cancers, blending basic and translational cancer genomics with functional mechanistic insights, with a focus on cancers prevalent among Indian patients, garnering over 11,600 citations globally (h-index: 41). The group led by him has been engaged in the study of cancer in the lung, breast, gallbladder, head and neck, tongue, and thyroid, and his research may be classified under three heads: cancer genomics, functional genomics, and pathogen discovery.

During his PhD in Developmental Biology at the University of Zurich, Dutt provided the first evidence for differential activity of an EGF splice variant, amplifying inductive signaling through the serine protease ROM-1 during vulval development in C. elegans. At the Broad Institute of MIT and Harvard, he identified novel oncogenic FGFR2 mutations, driving therapeutic advancements in endometrial cancers.

In lung cancer, Dutt described the first comprehensive landscape of actionable mutations in approximately 450 lung adenocarcinoma patients, identifying novel FGFR3 activating mutations in 5.5% of cases and establishing FGFR3 as a therapeutic target. His characterization of approximately 450 lung squamous subtype genomes similarly highlighted FGFR1 as a target, supporting subtype-specific lung cancer treatments by repurposing FGFR-targeted therapies. He also developed a mouse model demonstrating that weekly dosing of osimertinib achieves therapeutic efficacy, potentially reducing treatment costs to one-seventh of the standard monthly cost, leading to a clinical trial at Tata Memorial Centre. A 2025 study identified co-occurring tumour suppressor gene mutations as early indicators of relapse and poor prognosis in EGFR-mutant lung adenocarcinoma patients, highlighting ctDNA analysis as a non-invasive tool for monitoring clonal evolution.

In tongue cancer, Dutt provided the first genetic alteration landscape for Indian patients, noting a lack of HPV infection and a tobacco-associated mutational signature. He established the miR-944/MMP10/AXL-axis as critical for inducing the EMT phenotype, identified NOTCH1 alterations as essential for maintaining stem-like cells, and proposed MMP10 as a prognostic biomarker to potentially spare early-stage patients from elective neck dissection, with a clinical trial underway at Tata Memorial Centre. His comprehensive analysis of infectious pathogens across multiple cancers revealed a significant prevalence of Fusobacterium nucleatum in tongue tumours, mutually exclusive with HPV, and identified a novel UBE3C-LRP5 fusion transcript in head and neck cancer activating the Wnt/β-catenin pathway, with the FDA-approved drug pyrvinium pamoate showing promise in inhibiting tumour growth driven by this fusion. He also identified a genome signature associating tobacco chewing with oral cancer, and proposed MMP10 as a candidate to predict metastases in early-stage tongue cancer, potentially sparing patients from elective neck dissection.

In gallbladder cancer, Dutt proposed a carcinogenesis model tracing progression from dysplasia to invasive adenocarcinoma, identified a novel association with non-typhoidal Salmonella infection as an inflammatory trigger, and established that KRAS (G12V), but not KRAS (G13D), mutations predict response to anti-EGFR treatment.

In breast cancer, he elucidated the molecular basis of progesterone's impact on PR-negative cells and identified loss-of-function mutations in CDKN1B that confer resistance to tamoxifen and fulvestrant, while positioning CDKN1B as a prognostic biomarker guiding patients toward CDK4/6 inhibitor therapy. His lab has further extended its work to thyroid cancers, with comprehensive genomic profiling of both papillary and anaplastic thyroid cancers in Indian patients, identifying novel alterations including those in THRA as potential modifiers of cellular plasticity.

Of most significance, translating leads from his lab, Dutt developed a diagnostic test to detect EGFR mutations for lung cancer patients, reducing its cost from approximately $250 to $12 per test, currently offered at Tata Memorial Hospital on a routine basis. He developed ClinOme, a GUI-based automated tool for genomic analysis, now implemented in the Medical Oncology Department at Tata Memorial Hospital and commercialised through an MOU with 4baseCare Genomics Pvt Ltd. He contributed to the development of a first-of-its-kind Indian population-specific cancer gene panel based on whole exome and transcriptome data from 1,500 cancer patients. Computationally, his team developed HPVDetector, a freely distributable tool for detecting HPV types and integration sites using NGS data, adopted by over 350 laboratories across 39 countries. He established TMC-SNPdb, the first Indian SNP reference database from whole exome sequencing of 1,800 individuals, used by 200 research labs across 13 countries, and the Infectious Pathogen Detector (IPD), an in-silico GUI-based pipeline for NGS-based pathogen analysis, utilised by over 50 labs across 11 countries. His lab has also filed a patent (Application No. 202321054451) for novel fusion transcripts and their use in treating cancer. He also pioneered Raman Spectroscopy-based detection of RNA viruses in saliva, establishing a proof-of-principle for a rapid diagnostic method.

More recently, Dutt has established an ICMR Centre for Advanced Research at the University of Delhi South Campus, with a dedicated focus on cost-effective liquid biopsy approaches exploring the biology of fragmentomics and DNA methylation in cancer. The centre houses a state-of-the-art facility at the Dutt Lab, comprising an Element Aviti next-generation sequencing platform, a Bio-Rad QX600 ddPCR system with Automated Droplet Generator (Auto DG), an Agilent Bioanalyzer 2100 for nucleic acid quality assessment, and a QIAGEN EZ2 Connect for automated nucleic acid extraction. This infrastructure positions the lab at the forefront of non-invasive cancer diagnostics research in India, with particular interest in cancer-associated pathogens using spatial transcriptomics.

== Awards and honours ==
The Council of Scientific and Industrial Research, the apex agency of the Government of India for scientific research, awarded Dutt the Shanti Swarup Bhatnagar Prize for Science and Technology, one of the highest Indian science awards, for his contributions to medical sciences in 2017. (Note: Long link - please select award year to see details) He is also a recipient of the following awards and fellowships:

- Shanti Swarup Bhatnagar Prize for Science and Technology in Medical Sciences
- DBT Tata Innovation Fellowship, Department of Biotechnology, Government of India
- Featured among top 75 scientists of India shaping the future of the country by Department of Science and Technology
- Asian Scientist 100
- YIM Boston Young Scientist Award (2018)
- Distinguished Alumni Award, Jamia Millia Islamia
- Wellcome Trust/DBT India Alliance Intermediate Fellowship
- Ramalingaswami Fellowship, Department of Biotechnology, Government of India
- Swiss National Science Foundation Postdoctoral Fellowship, Switzerland
- Julius Klaus Foundation Fellowship Award, University of Zurich, Switzerland

== Other activities ==
Dutt has supervised ten doctoral graduates and trained eight postdoctoral fellows, with six PhD students and four postdoctoral researchers currently under his mentorship. He is a member of the faculty of F1000Prime and holds memberships in associations such as the American Association for Cancer Research, the Indian chapter of the Lung Cancer Consortium of Asia, the Society of Biological Chemists (India), and the Indian Association for Cancer Research. He serves on the editorial boards of BMC Genomics, PLOS One, Swiss Medical Weekly, and Frontiers in Oncology, and actively lends his expertise to several scientific advisory committees and selection panels for various government and private organisations, including committees of the Department of Biotechnology, Department of Science and Technology, and the Indian Council of Medical Research.

In 2021, Dutt led CoviScience@ACTREC, a community outreach initiative launched by scientists at ACTREC to combat the COVID-19 pandemic by vaccinating and educating underprivileged populations, successfully administering 6,557 vaccine doses funded through crowdfunding. He also established the R G Manudhane Scholarship Fund at ACTREC, creating a corpus of ₹60 lakhs through philanthropic donation to provide consistent fellowship support to PhD students facing funding shortfalls.

== Selected bibliography ==
- Ahmad S, Butle A, Karn A, Sunder R, Mishra R, Bawaskar B, Parab P, Raje V, Chaubal R, Shet T, Kundu G, Gupta S, Dutt A (2026). "CDKN1B inactivation impacts ER signaling and drives resistance to endocrine therapy in breast cancer". Br J Cancer. 135 (2): 303–315. doi:10.1038/s41416-026-03388-z. PMC 13310851. PMID 42020778.
- Ahmad S, Tyagi N, Singh D, Suresh A, Sunder R, Singh B, Dutt A (2025). "Genomic characterization of AI resistance in hormone receptor-positive breast cancer using LTED cell line models". Biochem Biophys Res Commun. 780 152450. doi:10.1016/j.bbrc.2025.152450. PMID 40812074.
- Trivedi V, Noronha V, Bal M, Chandrani P, Poojary D, Saldanha E, Choughule A, Pange P, Gupta V, Menon N, Patil V, Shah M, Chaturvedi P, Prabhash K, Dutt A (2025). "Comprehensive Genomic Profiling of Anaplastic Thyroid Cancer Identifies Alterations in THRA, a Potential Modifier of Cellular Plasticity". JCO Glob Oncol. 11 (11) e2400610. doi:10.1200/GO-24-00610. PMID 40674659.
- Behel V, Hait S, Noronha V, Chowdhury A, Chandrani P, Patil V, Menon N, Mishra R, Bawaskar B, Dahimbekar G, Shah M, Kaushal R, Veldore V, Goswami H, Bharde A, Khandare J, Shafi G, Choughule A, Tyagi N, Desai S, Prabhash K, Dutt A (2025). "Assessment of plasma derived microbiome profiles in lung cancer using targeted and whole exome sequencing". npj Syst Biol Appl. 11 (1) 62. doi:10.1038/s41540-025-00536-8. PMC 12145415. PMID 40483308.
- Trivedi V, Kore H, Poojary D, Noronha V, Bal M, Chandrani P, Choughule A, Pange P, Gupta V, Menon N, Patil V, Shah M, Chaturvedi P, Prabhash K, Dutt A (2025). "Genomic Characterization of Papillary Thyroid Cancer Reveals Germline Mutations Associated With Congenital Hypothyroidism". JCO Glob Oncol. 11 (11) e2500043. doi:10.1200/GO-25-00043. hdl:11343/364486. PMID 40440572.
- Hait S, Noronha V, Chowdhury A, Chaudhary A, Bawaskar B, Dahimbekar G, Ahmad S, Joshi A, Patil V, Menon N, Shah M, Kaushal R, Choughule A, Bharde A, Khandare J, Shafi G, Lakhwani D, Desai S, Chandrani P, Prabhash K, Dutt A (2025). "The impact of co-occurring tumor suppressor mutations with mEGFR as early indicators of relapse in lung cancer". ESMO Open. 10 (4) 104479. doi:10.1016/j.esmoop.2025.104479. PMC 11937282. PMID 40088801.
- Desai S, Ahmad S, Bawaskar B, Rashmi S, Mishra R, Lakhwani D, Dutt A (2024). "Singleton mutations in large-scale cancer genome studies: uncovering the tail of cancer genome". NAR Cancer. 6 (1) zcae010. doi:10.1093/narcan/zcae010. PMC 10939354. PMID 38487301.
- Dharavath B, Butle A, Chaudhary A, Pal A, Desai S, Chowdhury A, Thorat R, Upadhyay P, Nair S, Dutt A (2024). "Recurrent UBE3C-LRP5 translocations in head and neck cancer with therapeutic implications". npj Precis Oncol. 8 (1) 63. doi:10.1038/s41698-024-00555-4. PMC 10912599. PMID 38438481.
- Dharavath B, Butle A, Pal A, Desai S, Upadhyay P, Rane A, Khandelwal R, Manavalan S, Thorat R, Sonawane K, Vaish R, Gera P, Bal M, D'Cruz AK, Nair S, Dutt A (2023). "Role of miR-944/MMP10/AXL-axis in lymph node metastasis in tongue cancer". Commun Biol. 6 (1) 57. doi:10.1038/s42003-023-04437-6. PMC 9845355. PMID 36650344.
- Trivedi V, Noronha V, Sreekanthreddy P, Desai S, Poojary D, Varghese L, Gowda P, Butle A, Mishra R, Bal M, Mittal N, Rane S, Kane S, Basu S, Patil V, Menon N, Singh AK, Chaturvedi P, Chandrani P, Choughule A, Veldore V, Prabhash K, Dutt A (2023). "Association of Cutibacterium acnes with human thyroid cancer". Front Endocrinol (Lausanne). 14 1152514. doi:10.3389/fendo.2023.1152514. PMC 10668118. PMID 38027096.
- Yadav N, Sunder R, Desai S, Dharavath B, Chandrani P, Godbole M, Dutt A (2022). "Progesterone modulates the DSCAM-AS1/miR-130a/ESR1 axis to suppress cell invasion and migration in breast cancer". Breast Cancer Res. 24 (1) 97. doi:10.1186/s13058-022-01597-x. PMC 9798554. PMID 36578092.
- Joshi A, Butle A, Hait S, Mishra R, Trivedi V, Thorat R, Choughule A, Noronha V, Prabhash K, Dutt A (2022). "Osimertinib for lung cancer cells harboring low-frequency EGFR T790M mutation". Transl Oncol. 22 101461. doi:10.1016/j.tranon.2022.101461. PMC 9156817. PMID 35653897.
- Desai S, Mishra R, Ahmad S, Hait S, Joshi A, Dutt A (2022). "TMC-SNPdb 2.0: an ethnic-specific database of Indian germline variants". Database (Oxford). 2022. doi:10.1093/database/baac035. PMC 9216475. PMID 35551364.
- Desai S, Dharavath B, Manavalan S, Rane A, Redhu AK, Sunder R, Butle A, Mishra R, Joshi A, Togar T, Apte S, Bala P, Chandrani P, Chopra S, Bashyam MD, Banerjee A, Prabhash K, Nair S, Dutt A (2022). "Fusobacterium nucleatum is associated with inflammation and poor survival in early-stage HPV-negative tongue cancer". NAR Cancer. 4 (1) zcac006. doi:10.1093/narcan/zcac006. PMC 8894079. PMID 35252868.
- Butle A, Joshi A, Noronha V, Prabhash K, Dutt A (2021). "Weekly osimertinib dosing prevents EGFR mutant tumor cells destined to home mouse lungs". Transl Oncol. 14 (8) 101111. doi:10.1016/j.tranon.2021.101111. PMC 8236545. PMID 33993094.
- Desai S, Rane A, Joshi A, Dutt A (2021). "IPD 2.0: To derive insights from an evolving SARS-CoV-2 genome". BMC Bioinformatics. 22 (1): 247. doi:10.1186/s12859-021-04166-9. PMC 8118100. PMID 33985433.
- Joshi A, Mishra R, Desai S, Chandrani P, Kore H, Sunder R, Hait S, Iyer P, Trivedi V, Choughule A, Noronha V, Joshi A, Patil V, Menon N, Kumar R, Prabhash K, Dutt A (2021). "Molecular characterization of lung squamous cell carcinoma tumors reveals therapeutically relevant alterations". Oncotarget. 12 (6): 578–588. doi:10.18632/oncotarget.27918. PMC 7984830. PMID 33796225.
- Desai S, Rashmi S, Rane A, Dharavath B, Sawant A, Dutt A (2021). "An integrated approach to determine the abundance, mutation rate and phylogeny of the SARS-CoV-2 genome". Brief Bioinform. 22 (2): 1065–1075. doi:10.1093/bib/bbab006. PMC 7929363. PMID 33479725.
- Dharavath B, Yadav N, Desai S, Sunder R, Mishra R, Ketkar M, Bhanshe P, Gupta A, Redhu AK, Patkar N, Dutt S, Gupta S, Dutt A (2020). "A one-step, one-tube real-time RT-PCR based assay with an automated analysis for detection of SARS-CoV-2". Heliyon. 6 (7) e04405. Bibcode:2020Heliy...604405D. doi:10.1016/j.heliyon.2020.e04405. PMC 7341355. PMID 32665985.
- Desai S, Mishra SV, Joshi A, Sarkar D, Hole A, Mishra R, Dutt S, Chilakapati MK, Gupta S, Dutt A (2020). "Raman spectroscopy-based detection of RNA viruses in saliva: A preliminary report". J Biophotonics. 13 (10) e202000189. doi:10.1002/jbio.202000189. PMC 7361326. PMID 32609429.
- Arora R, Rekhi B, Chandrani P, Krishna S, Dutt A (2019). "Merkel cell polyomavirus is implicated in a subset of Merkel cell carcinomas, in the Indian subcontinent". Microb Pathog. 137 103778. doi:10.1016/j.micpath.2019.103778. PMC 7166130. PMID 31600537.
- Iyer P, Shrikhande SV, Ranjan M, Joshi A, Gardi N, Prasad R, Dharavath B, Thorat R, Salunkhe S, Sahoo B, Chandrani P, Kore H, Mohanty B, Chaudhari V, Choughule A, Kawle D, Chaudhari P, Ingle A, Banavali S, Gera P, Ramadwar MR, Prabhash K, Dutt A (2019). "ERBB2 and KRAS alterations mediate response to EGFR inhibitors in early stage gallbladder cancer". Int J Cancer. 144 (8): 2008–2019. doi:10.1002/ijc.31906. PMC 6378102. PMID 30304546.
- Godbole M, Togar T, Patel K, Dharavath B, Yadav N, Janjuha S, Gardi N, Tiwary K, Terwadkar P, Desai S, Prasad R, Dhamne H, Karve K, Salunkhe S, Kawle D, Chandrani P, Dutt S, Gupta S, Badwe RA, Dutt A (2018). "Up-regulation of the kinase gene SGK1 by progesterone activates the AP-1-NDRG1 axis in both PR-positive and -negative breast cancer cells". J Biol Chem. 293 (50): 19263–19276. doi:10.1074/jbc.RA118.002894. PMC 6298595. PMID 30337371.
- Godbole M, Chandrani P, Gardi N, Dhamne H, Patel K, Yadav N, Gupta S, Badwe R, Dutt A (2017). "miR-129-2 mediates down-regulation of progesterone receptor in response to progesterone in breast cancer cells". Cancer Biol Ther. 18 (10): 801–805. doi:10.1080/15384047.2017.1373216. PMC 5678702. PMID 28876975.
- Upadhyay P, Gardi N, Desai S, Chandrani P, Joshi A, Dharavath B, Arora P, Bal M, Nair S, Dutt A (2017). "Genomic characterization of tobacco/nut chewing HPV-negative early stage tongue tumors identify MMP10 as a candidate to predict metastases". Oral Oncol. 73: 56–64. doi:10.1016/j.oraloncology.2017.08.003. PMC 5628952. PMID 28939077.
- Godbole M, Tiwary K, Badwe R, Gupta S, Dutt A (2017). "Progesterone suppresses the invasion and migration of breast cancer cells irrespective of their progesterone receptor status - a short report". Cell Oncol (Dordr). 40 (4): 411–417. doi:10.1007/s13402-017-0330-z. PMC 5537311. PMID 28653288.
- Chandrani P, Prabhash K, Prasad R, Sethunath V, Ranjan M, Iyer P, Aich J, Dhamne H, Iyer DN, Upadhyay P, Mohanty B, Chandna P, Kumar R, Joshi A, Noronha V, Patil V, Ramaswamy A, Karpe A, Thorat R, Chaudhari P, Ingle A, Choughule A, Dutt A (2016). "Drug-sensitive FGFR3 mutations in lung adenocarcinoma". Ann Oncol. 28 (3) (published 2017): 597–603. doi:10.1093/annonc/mdw636. PMC 5391708. PMID 27998968.
- Upadhyay P, Gardi N, Desai S, Sahoo B, Singh A, Togar T, Iyer P, Prasad R, Chandrani P, Gupta S, Dutt A (2016). "TMC-SNPdb: an Indian germline variant database derived from whole exome sequences". Database. 2016 baw104. doi:10.1093/database/baw104. PMC 4940432. PMID 27402678.
- Upadhyay P, Nair S, Kaur E, Aich J, Dani P, Sethunath V, Gardi N, Chandrani P, Godbole M, Sonawane K, Prasad R, Kannan S, Agarwal B, Kane S, Gupta S, Dutt S, Dutt A (2016). "Notch pathway activation is essential for maintenance of stem-like cells in early tongue cancer". Oncotarget. 7 (31): 50437–50449. doi:10.18632/oncotarget.10419. PMC 5226594. PMID 27391340.
- Iyer P, Barreto SG, Sahoo B, Chandrani P, Ramadwar MR, Shrikhande SV, Dutt A (2016). "Non-typhoidal Salmonella DNA traces in gallbladder cancer". Infect Agents Cancer. 11 12. doi:10.1186/s13027-016-0057-x (inactive 13 September 2026). PMC 4776363. PMID 26941832.
- Chandrani P, Upadhyay P, Iyer P, Tanna M, Shetty M, Raghuram GV, Oak N, Singh A, Chaubal R, Ramteke M, Gupta S, Dutt A (2015). "Integrated genomics approach to identify biologically relevant alterations in fewer samples". BMC Genomics. 16 936. doi:10.1186/s12864-015-2138-4. PMC 4647579. PMID 26572163.
- Chandrani P, Kulkarni V, Iyer P, Upadhyay P, Chaubal R, Das P, Mulherkar R, Singh R, Dutt A (2015). "NGS-based approach to determine the presence of HPV and their sites of integration in human cancer genome". Br J Cancer. 112 (12): 1958–65. doi:10.1038/bjc.2015.121. PMC 4580395. PMID 25973533.
- Choughule A, Sharma R, Trivedi V, Thavamani A, Noronha V, Joshi A, Desai S, Chandrani P, Sundaram P, Utture S, Jambhekar N, Gupta S, Aich J, Prabhash K, Dutt A (2014). "Coexistence of KRAS mutation with mutant but not wild-type EGFR predicts response to tyrosine-kinase inhibitors in human lung cancer". Br J Cancer. 111 (11): 2203–4. doi:10.1038/bjc.2014.401. PMC 4260019. PMID 25117816.
- Barreto SG, Dutt A, Chaudhary A (2014). "A genetic model for gallbladder carcinogenesis and its dissemination". Ann Oncol. 25 (6): 1086–97. doi:10.1093/annonc/mdu006. PMC 4037856. PMID 24705974.
- Chougule A, Prabhash K, Noronha V, Joshi A, Thavamani A, Chandrani P, Upadhyay P, Utture S, Desai S, Jambhekar N, Dutt A (2013). "Frequency of EGFR mutations in 907 lung adenocarcinoma patients of Indian ethnicity". PLOS ONE. 8 (10) e76164. Bibcode:2013PLoSO...876164C. doi:10.1371/journal.pone.0076164. PMC 3790706. PMID 24124538.
- Noronha V, Prabhash K, Thavamani A, Chougule A, Purandare N, Joshi A, Sharma R, Desai S, Jambekar N, Dutt A, Mulherkar R (2013). "EGFR mutations in Indian lung cancer patients: clinical correlation and outcome to EGFR targeted therapy". PLOS ONE. 8 (4) e61561. Bibcode:2013PLoSO...861561N. doi:10.1371/journal.pone.0061561. PMC 3631198. PMID 23620765.
- Dutt A, Ramos AH, Hammerman PS, Mermel C, Cho J, Sharifnia T, Chande A, Tanaka KE, Stransky N, Greulich H, Gray NS, Meyerson M (2011). "Inhibitor-sensitive FGFR1 amplification in human non-small cell lung cancer". PLOS ONE. 6 (6) e20351. Bibcode:2011PLoSO...620351D. doi:10.1371/journal.pone.0020351. PMC 3110189. PMID 21666749.
- Dutt A, Salvesen HB, Greulich H, Sellers WR, Beroukhim R, Meyerson M (2009). "Somatic mutations are present in all members of the AKT family in endometrial carcinoma". Br J Cancer. 101 (7): 1218–9. doi:10.1038/sj.bjc.6605301. PMC 2768084. PMID 19738612.
- Dutt A, Salvesen HB, Chen TH, Ramos AH, Onofrio RC, Hatton C, Nicoletti R, Winckler W, Grewal R, Hanna M, Wyhs N, Ziaugra L, Richter DJ, Trovik J, Engelsen IB, Stefansson IM, Fennell T, Cibulskis K, Zody MC, Akslen LA, Gabriel S, Wong KK, Sellers WR, Meyerson M, Greulich H (2008). "Drug-sensitive FGFR2 mutations in endometrial carcinoma". Proc Natl Acad Sci U S A. 105 (25): 8713–7. Bibcode:2008PNAS..105.8713D. doi:10.1073/pnas.0803379105. PMC 2438391. PMID 18552176.
- Dutt A, Canevascini S, Froehli-Hoier E, Hajnal A (2004). "EGF signal propagation during C. elegans vulval development mediated by ROM-1 rhomboid". PLOS Biol. 2 (11) e334. doi:10.1371/journal.pbio.0020334. PMC 519001. PMID 15455032.

== See also ==
- Carcinogenesis
- Matrix metalloproteinase
