= Urinary cell-free DNA =

Urinary cell-free DNA (ucfDNA) refers to DNA fragments in urine released by urogenital and non-urogenital cells. Shed cells on urogenital tract release high- or low-molecular-weight DNA fragments via apoptosis and necrosis, while circulating cell-free DNA (cfDNA) that passes through glomerular pores contributes to low-molecular-weight DNA. Most of the ucfDNA is low-molecular-weight DNA in the size of 150-250 base pairs. The detection of ucfDNA composition allows the quantification of cfDNA, circulating tumour DNA, and cell-free fetal DNA components. Many commercial kits and devices have been developed for ucfDNA isolation, quantification, and quality assessment.

Its non-invasive advantage allows routine measurement for patients who require long-term assessment. Different DNA alternations in ucfDNA are associated with cancer development and progression, therapeutic response, and prognosis. The assessment of ucfDNA is not limited to urological cancer only, but also applies to non-urological cancer and diseases. Additionally, prenatal diagnosis and organ transplantation monitoring are other potential applications. Sensitivity and specificity of some ucfDNA applications are comparable to other standards in liquid biopsy. However, clinical applications of ucfDNA have not been popularized yet due to limited clinical trials.

== Origin and formation ==
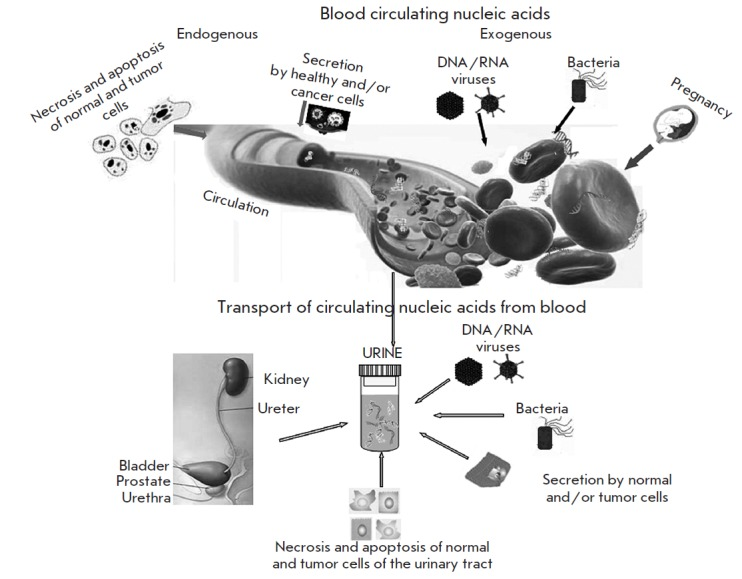
Sources of cell-free nucleic acids in the urine and blood.

UcfDNA originates from two sources: cells shed from the urogenital tract and transrenal-DNA.

=== Cells shed from the urogenital tract ===
Most ucfDNA is derived from urogenital tract cells. Approximately over 3 million urogenital tract cells are exfoliated into urine per day. These cells undergo apoptosis (primarily) or necrosis to release fragmented nucleic acids. Necrotic lymphocytes, kidney, prostate, and urinary bladder contribute to high-molecular-weight DNA, while apoptotic cells from the urogenital tract contribute to low-molecular-weight DNA.

=== Transrenal-DNA ===
Transrenal-DNA (Tr-DNA) is formed by the ultrafiltration of cell-free DNA (cfDNA) in blood plasma. As cfDNA exists in the form of supramolecular complexes such as nucleosomes, its large size restricts ultrafiltration. Only low-molecular-weight cfDNA can pass through the glomerular basement membrane and slit membranes between podocytes to become tr-DNA. The exact mechanism of the passage of cfDNA is yet to be determined, as the process of crossing through the kidney barrier involves multiple factors such as molecular weight, hydrodynamic form, and charge of the DNA fragments.

Tr-DNA contains genetic information from various types of dead cells throughout the body. Possible sources are maturing placental and fetal tissues, tumor tissues, transplanted tissues, and nonhuman agents (infectious agents). Nonhuman ucfDNA from pathogens allows the detection of bacterial or viral infection.

== Categorization by size ==
UcfDNA is classified into two categories based on its size: high-molecular-weight and low-molecular-weight.

High-molecular-weight ucfDNA refers to DNA fragments in urine with the size longer than a kilobase pair (kbp). They are separated together with cell debris by centrifugation of urine and they represent the genome of the originated cells.

In contrast, low-molecular-weight ucfDNA is DNA fragments in urine sized with hundreds of bp, and appears in the supernatant after centrifugation. The majority of ucfDNA exists in the form of low-molecular-weight DNA with a size of 150-250 bp. Early understanding suggested that nucleosides, nucleotides, and short oligonucleotides with only several base pairs size were the majority. However, later research discovered fragments in larger sizes.

== Methods ==
Extraction and assessment of ucfDNA can be categorized into four stages: urine collection, ucfDNA isolation, quantification, and quality assessment. A wide range of commercial kits have been developed to facilitate ucfDNA extraction and quantification.

=== Urine collection and ucfDNA isolation ===
Urine extraction methods vary with the difference in desired ucfDNA sizes and origins. For example, urine collection in the morning increases ucfDNA yield as more cellular debris from the urogenital tract are shed overnight. However, this approach limits the sensitivity of tr-DNA due to the masking effect of a high amount of DNA from the urogenital tract cells. Generally, an increase in urine volume collected enhances the sensitivity and specificity of quantification. Before ucfDNA isolation, appropriate preservation methods (e.g. using EDTA to inhibit nuclease in urine and freezing) prevent unstable ucfDNA from degradation. As mentioned, the isolation of ucfDNA from urine sample can be done with different commercial kits depending on the target of isolation.

=== Quantification ===
The most commonly adopted methods are spectrophotometry, the fluorimetric method, and PCR. Spectrophotometry quantifies both double-strand and single-strand DNA fragments, but it is more susceptible to contamination; the fluorimetric method quantifies only single-strand DNA; PCR allows the quantification of amplifiable DNA. DNA aberrations such as DNA integrity, mutation, and microsatellite instability, or the presence of foreign DNA such as viral DNA are frequently analyzed. Owing to the advancement in molecular assays, new methods such as next-generation sequencing, ddPCR and automated microscopy systems have significantly enhanced the sensitivity of ucfDNA detection.

=== Quality assessment ===
Quality assessment of extracted ucfDNA is critical for obtaining information on the types, concentration and purity of ucfDNA. Quantitative and qualitative data can be acquired with different devices, such as fluorometer and electrophoresis machine.

== Advantages and limitations of urinary cell-free DNA applications ==
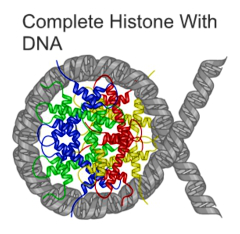
The DNA (grey) is wrapped around the nucleosomal core proteins (colored). UcfDNA degrades at a high rate due to the absence of this nucleosomal structure.

Sampling by ucfDNA offers an ultra-noninvasive solution as compared with other techniques in clinical diagnosis and monitoring. Conventional techniques such as liquid biopsy, venipuncture, and tissue sampling are common. However, these typical methods still carry a certain level of risk and inconvenience to both patients and healthcare professionals. With ultra-noninvasive urine collection, patients are able to collect large volumes of urine routinely. Higher patient compliance and detection feasibility are expected.

However, the instability of ucfDNA in urine remains a major limitation in ucfDNA applications. Nuclease (DNase I and II), bacteria, and variable pH in urine are suggested as the possible factors. Adding to the reason that DNA is not protected by protein (such as histone), ucfDNA degrades at a high rate. Some genetic features such as short tandem repeats may be lost in the degradation process, although it is still uncertain why some genetic features such as intact bacterial DNA can be preserved. Future advancement in molecular assays is anticipated to overcome this limitation.

Clinical applications of ucfDNA are still in the experimental stage. More evidence from clinical trials is required to implement ucfDNA applications into the bedside.

== Potential clinical applications ==
Various diagnostic systems and molecular assays of ucfDNA can be set up for different clinical purposes. Specific DNA alternations and biomarkers in ucfDNA allow the observation of physiological processes and disease evolution.

Potential clinical application of ucfDNA

Cancer diagnosis

- Bladder cancer (TopoIIA)
- Prostate cancer (TSPAN13:S100A9 ratio, c-Myc, BCAS1, and HER2)
- Colorectal cancer (KRAS mutations, vimentin)
- Hepatocellular carcinoma (HCC)-associated HBV mutation, TP53 mutation)
- Cervical cancer (HPV DNA)

Cancer monitoring

- Bladder cancer (FGFR3 and PIK3CA mutations)
- Prostate cancer (copy number variant)
- Colorectal cancer (CAD-ALK gene)
- NSCLC (EGFR and KRAS mutations)
- Gastric cancer (EGFR mutations)
- Nasopharyngeal carcinoma (EBV DNA level)

Pathogen detection

- AIDs (HIV)
- Malaria (Plasmodium)
- Leishmaniasis (Leishmania)
- Anthrax (Bacillus anthracis)
- Tuberculosis (Mycobacterium tuberculosis)

Prenatal diagnosis

Organ transplantation

- Detect rejection after renal transplantation

=== Cancer diagnosis ===
Diagnosis of cancer can be performed by the detection of genetic alterations, including DNA integrity, methylation profile, and mutations. For ucfDNA, cancer markers can be generally divided into two groups: urological cancer marker and non-urological cancer marker.

==== Urological Cancer ====
Urological cancer includes renal cancer, bladder cancer, and prostate cancer. These organs are in direct contact with the urinary tract. As a result, urine samples contain cfDNA derived from apoptotic tumor cells, making ucfDNA favorable for the diagnosis of genetic and epigenetic alterations. Two of the most studied urological cancer are bladder cancer and prostate cancer.

For bladder cancer, urine creatinine-adjusted ucfDNA concentration and integrity of ucfDNA in cancer patients were found to be different from healthy individuals, suggesting it to be an effective potential diagnostic marker. Analysis of ucfDNA integrity demonstrates adequate sensitivity and specificity for early diagnosis. Moreover, urine samples were also examined for the presence of TopoIIA cfDNA in bladder cancer patients, and proven to show a significant difference between healthy individuals and the patients. Additionally, levels of TopoIIA cfDNA in urine also distinguish between muscle-invasive bladder cancer (MIBC) and non-muscle invasive bladder cancer (NMIBC).

For prostate cancer, the investigation focuses on ucfDNA integrity. Previous studies showed that TSPAN13 to S100A9 ratios were greater in prostate cancer patients, suggesting that it as a potential biomarker for prostate cancer diagnosis. Evaluation of ucfDNA integrity by quantifying sequences (> 250 bp) of c-Myc, BCAS1, and HER2 genes also showed acceptable sensitivity and specificity, which further solidifies its role as a diagnostic biomarker.

==== Non-urological Cancer ====
Non-urological cancer can be diagnosed through the presence of tr-DNA from cancerous cells. Previous studies include the evaluation of colorectal cancer (KRAS mutations and vimentin), hepatocellular carcinoma (HCC-associated HBV mutation and TP53 mutation), and cervical cancer (HPV) with ucfDNA. Screening and testing with ucfDNA are able to detect specific tumor DNA or DNA mutations, indicating its potential for non-invasive diagnosis and personalized screening.

=== Cancer monitoring ===
Many tumour markers in ucfDNA have been researched to monitor cancer progression, therapeutic response, and prognosis. Cancer monitoring by ucfDNA has a high sensitivity for both urogenital cancer and some non-urogenital cancer. The non-invasive nature of ucfDNA test allows regular follow-up in predicting and preventing tumour progression, metastasis, and relapse. Ultimately it helps to increase the patient survival rate. During the treatment, efficiency data generated from ucfDNA can also be applied in drug development.

Different levels and genetic markers in ucfDNA can be the indicators of the types and stages of cancer. The level of variants in ucfDNA is higher in various types of cancer, including: bladder cancer (FGFR3 and PIK3CA mutations), prostate cancer (copy number variants), colorectal cancer (CAD-ALK gene rearrangement), NSCLC (EGFR and KRAS mutations), gastric cancer (EGFR mutations), nasopharyngeal carcinoma (EBV DNA). Meanwhile, there is a positive correlation between the ucfDNA quantity and the disease outcome, and a surge in 24–72 hours after chemotherapy could be interpreted as an effective treatment.

The ability of monitoring cancer through ucfDNA is comparable to other conventional sources such as blood plasma and tissue. Both sensitivity and specificity levels are higher than 80% in most of the past clinical trials. In some papers, the concordance rate can reach close to 100%. These highly concordant results suggest the possibility of ucfDNA replacing invasive traditional cancer monitoring techniques.

=== Pathogen detection ===
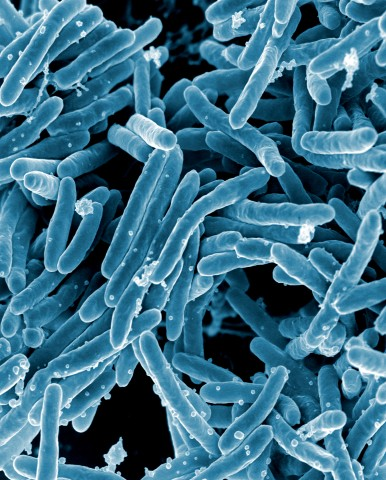
Scanning electron micrograph of Mycobacterium tuberculosis bacteria. Its DNA can be found as ucfDNA in tuberculosis patients.

Pathogenesis of kidney or bladder infections are accompanied by the presence of the causative agent in the urine. DNA fragments of the human immunodeficiency virus (HIV), Plasmodium, and Leishmania can be detected in the infected individuals' urine samples. This is due to the apoptotic cells originating from the pathogens. Pathogen detection in urine covers for parasites, viruses, and bacteria. The detection is theoretically applicable for eukaryotic parasites only as they have internucleosomal DNA fragmentation in cell death, but it is also possible for prokaryotic DNA as in the form of tr-DNA. Examples included Bacillus anthracis and Mycobacterium tuberculosis (Causative agent of tuberculosis, TB). Both pathogeneses involve the apoptosis of bacterial cells and host macrophages, and they contain pathogen DNA that can be identified in the urine samples of the patients. For TB patients, ucfDNA, specifically tr-DNA, can be used to detect and monitor the disease and as its corresponding treatment. Recent studies have reflected the successful detection of mutated muscle cell mitochondrial DNA, which is similar to bacterial DNA as both do not acquire nucleosomal structure in the urine. Detection of viral DNA is also viable as the nucleosomal DNA of virus is subjected to apoptotic fragmentation.

=== Prenatal diagnosis ===
Cell-free fetal DNA (cffDNA) can be found in cfDNA. Via glomerular filtration, cffDNA shows up in maternal urine as tr-DNA. As a result, tr-DNA appears at a higher level during pregnancy in urine samples. The elevation of tr-DNA in maternal urine lasts from early first trimester to two months after parturition. Potential applications of prenatal DNA in urine include early sex determination (as hinted by the presence of male Y-chromosomal DNA in maternal urine), Rh incompatibility, and genetic disease. However, the detection of cffDNA in maternal urine has a low sensitivity and specificity due to the short length and half-life of cffDNA fragments.

=== Organ transplantation ===
The application of ucfDNA for monitoring allograft status is attributed to the difference in genetic information between donor-derived cell-free DNA (dd-cfDNA) and recipient cfDNA. The measurement of ucfDNA origin can be used to detect allograft injuries and rejection of transplanted organs tissues after the organ transplantation. In cases of rejection after renal transplantation, large amounts of donor DNA can be detected in the recipient's urine samples.
