= DELFI Diagnostics =

American liquid biopsy company

- Type: Private
- Industry: Biotechnology, medical diagnostics
- Founded: 2019; 7 years ago
- Founders: Victor Velculescu, Robert Scharpf, Jillian Phallen
- Headquarters: Palo Alto, California, United States
- Key people: Susan Tousi (CEO)
- Products: FirstLook Lung, DELFI-TF
- Number of employees: ~100 (2026)

DELFI Diagnostics is an American biotechnology company that develops blood-based liquid biopsy tests for the early detection and monitoring of cancer. The company is based in Palo Alto, California, and was founded in 2019 based on research conducted at the Johns Hopkins University Sidney Kimmel Comprehensive Cancer Center. Its technology, known as DNA fragmentomics, analyzes patterns in fragments of cell-free DNA in the blood using machine learning to assess the likelihood of cancer.

== History ==
DELFI Diagnostics was founded in 2019 by researchers from Johns Hopkins University, including Victor Velculescu, Robert Scharpf, and Jillian Phallen. The company's approach originated in the laboratories of Velculescu and Scharpf at the Johns Hopkins Sidney Kimmel Comprehensive Cancer Center, where the underlying method was first described in a 2019 paper in the journal Nature. The name DELFI is derived from "DNA evaluation of fragments for early interception".In January 2024, the company appointed Susan Tousi, formerly chief commercial officer of Illumina, as chief executive officer. Tousi succeeded co-founder Victor Velculescu, who remained on the company's board of directors.

== Technology ==
DELFI's tests are based on a method the company calls DNA fragmentomics. Rather than searching for specific tumor mutations in a blood sample, the approach examines genome-wide patterns in the size and distribution of cell-free DNA fragments, which differ between people with and without cancer because of differences in how DNA is packaged. A machine-learning classifier compares an individual's fragmentation pattern against reference populations.In the original 2019 Nature study, the method detected cancer in 73 percent of patients across several cancer types while correctly classifying 98 percent of healthy individuals.

=== Products ===
FirstLook Lung is a blood-based laboratory developed test intended to help identify people who should proceed to low-dose computed tomography screening for lung cancer. DELFI launched the test in October 2023. It is offered as a laboratory developed test and has not received Food and Drug Administration approval; the company has said it is developing an FDA-regulated version.In the company's L101 clinical validation study, published in 2024 in Cancer Discovery, the assay was reported to have approximately 80 percent sensitivity and a negative predictive value of 99.7 percent in its intended-use population.

DELFI-TF is a research service that uses cell-free DNA fragmentation analysis to monitor a patient's response to cancer treatment. The underlying method was described in a 2024 paper in Nature Communications.

== Clinical studies ==
DELFI's technology has been evaluated in several clinical studies. The L101 study was a multicenter case-control study used to develop and validate the lung cancer classifier. CASCADE-LUNG (also designated L201) is a larger prospective observational study comparing the blood test with low-dose CT screening in high-risk individuals. In 2026, the company reported the first clinical utility data from its FIRSTLUNG (L301) study, described as an interventional trial evaluating whether a blood-based test increases lung cancer screening uptake, at the American Thoracic Society International Conference.The company has also formed clinical research partnerships, including a study with City of Hope funded by a grant from the American Cancer Society to improve screening rates in underserved communities, and a collaboration with Hackensack Meridian Health supported by a grant from Eli Lilly and Company.
