= Cell-free DNA =

Cell-free DNA could refer to:

- Cell-free fetal DNA
- Cell-free tumour DNA
- Cell-free circulating mitochondrial DNA
- Circulating free DNA
