= Trevor Pugh =

Canadian researcher

Trevor J. Pugh FACMG
- Born: Vancouver, British Columbia, Canada
- Education: University of British Columbia (PhD); Harvard Medical School (Fellowship)
- Known for: Cancer genomics, cell-free DNA sequencing, immune repertoire profiling, contributions to AACR Project GENIE
- Awards: Canada Research Chair in Translational Genomics; Member, College of New Scholars, Artists and Scientists, Royal Society of Canada (2024); Canada's Top 40 Under 40 (2020); Highly Cited Researchers (2019, 2020); Terry Fox New Investigator Award (2017)
- Scientific career
- Fields: Cancer genomics, Translational genomics, Bioinformatics, Molecular genetics
- Workplaces: University of Toronto; Princess Margaret Cancer Centre, University Health Network; Ontario Institute for Cancer Research
- Doctoral advisor: Marco Marra
- Website: pughlab.org

Trevor J. Pugh is a Canadian cancer genomics researcher, molecular geneticist, and bioinformatician. He is a Senior Scientist at the Princess Margaret Cancer Centre (PMCC), University Health Network, Director of the Genomics Program and Senior Investigator at the Ontario Institute for Cancer Research (OICR), and a professor in the Department of Medical Biophysics at the University of Toronto. He holds the Canada Research Chair in Translational Genomics. Pugh's research focuses on applying genome sequencing technologies, particularly liquid biopsy techniques like cell-free DNA (cfDNA) analysis and immune repertoire sequencing, to understand cancer evolution during treatment and guide patient care.

== Early life and education ==
Pugh is originally from Vancouver, British Columbia. He received his PhD in Medical Genetics from the University of British Columbia, where he was mentored by Marco Marra at the BC Cancer Agency. Following his PhD, he undertook postdoctoral research at the Dana–Farber Cancer Institute and the Broad Institute of Harvard and MIT under the mentorship of Matthew Meyerson. During this time, he also completed a clinical laboratory fellowship in the Harvard Medical School Genetics Training Program with Heidi Rehm, becoming a board-certified molecular geneticist and Fellow of the American College of Medical Genetics and Genomics (FACMG).

== Career ==
Pugh established his independent research laboratory at the Princess Margaret Cancer Centre, part of the University Health Network in Toronto, Ontario. He holds appointments as a Senior Scientist at PMCC and Professor in the Department of Medical Biophysics at the University of Toronto. He also serves as a Senior Investigator and Director of the Genomics Program at the Ontario Institute for Cancer Research (OICR). In these roles, he directs the Princess Margaret Genomics Centre and the OICR Genomics Program, which includes the Translational Genomics Laboratory. These programs provide genomic analysis capabilities, including single-cell sequencing, cfDNA analysis, and clinically accredited whole-genome sequencing, for research and clinical applications.

He has contributed significantly to large-scale international genomics initiatives, including The Cancer Genome Atlas (TCGA), the American Association for Cancer Research (AACR) Project GENIE (Genomics Evidence Neoplasia Information Exchange), the National Cancer Institute's Therapeutically Applicable Research to Generate Effective Treatments (TARGET) initiative, and the Terry Fox Marathon of Hope Cancer Centres Network. He also serves on advisory committees for organizations such as Cancer Care Ontario, the Canadian Cancer Trials Group, and the BC Cancer Agency's Personalized OncoGenomics (POG) Program.

== Research ==
Pugh's research program focuses on translational cancer genomics, aiming to integrate comprehensive genomic analysis into routine clinical practice. A primary area of investigation is the use of liquid biopsies, analyzing cell-free DNA (cfDNA) and T-cell receptor repertoires in blood samples, to monitor tumor evolution, immune responses, and treatment effectiveness non-invasively. His work has demonstrated that changes in circulating tumor DNA (ctDNA) levels can predict patient responses to immunotherapy. He also develops novel methods for genomic analysis, including a hybrid-capture technique for immune repertoire profiling.

His laboratory uses cfDNA sequencing, single-cell RNA sequencing (scRNA-seq), and whole-genome sequencing to study clonal dynamics in cancer cells and associated immune cells during treatment across various cancer types, including multiple myeloma and patients undergoing immunotherapy. His team is also involved in research using cfDNA to detect cancer earlier in high-risk hereditary cancer syndromes, such as Li–Fraumeni syndrome, through initiatives like the CHARM (cfDNA in Hereditary and High-Risk Malignancies) Consortium.

During his postdoctoral work, Pugh led significant studies characterizing the genomic landscapes of pediatric cancers like medulloblastoma, neuroblastoma, and pleuropulmonary blastoma. His research group has also contributed to the genomic characterization of multiple myeloma and urothelial carcinoma.

== Awards and recognition ==
- 2024: Elected Member, College of New Scholars, Artists and Scientists, Royal Society of Canada
- Canada Research Chair in Translational Genomics
- 2020: Canada's Top 40 Under 40
- 2019, 2020: Highly Cited Researchers (Clarivate Analytics)
- 2017: Terry Fox New Investigator Award
- StandUp2Cancer Phillip A. Sharp Innovation in Collaboration Award
- Till and McCulloch Paper of the Year Award
- Canadian Cancer Society Bernard and Francine Dorval Prize
