= Martin Picard (scientist) =

Canadian-American mitochondrial psychobiologist

- Born: Québec, Canada
- Citizenship: Canadian, American
- Education: McGill University (BSc) McGill University (PhD) University of Pennsylvania (Postdoc)
- Known for: Mitochondrial psychobiology
- Awards: Baszucki Prize in Science (2024) Herbert Weiner Early Career Award (2023) Early Career Impact Award from the Federation of Associations in Behavioral & Brain Sciences (2021) Neal E. Miller Award (2019)
- Website: PicardLab.org

Martin Picard is a Canadian-American mitochondrial psychobiologist. He is a Professor of Behavioral Medicine at Columbia University Irving Medical Center, with appointments in the Department of Psychiatry, Department of Neurology, and the Robert N. Butler Columbia Aging Center. Picard is also a Columbia Translational Neuroscience Initiative (CTNI) Scholar and Co-Director of the Columbia Science of Health (SOH) Program.

He leads the Mitochondrial Psychobiology Group, which integrates the science of energy, mitochondrial biology, and cellular energy metabolism with human stress physiology, aging, brain function, and mental health.

== Education and early life ==
Picard is a native of Montreal, Québec, Canada. Picard received a B.Sc. with Honors in neuroimmunology and a Ph.D. in the mitochondrial biology of aging from McGill University. He completed postdoctoral training with Douglas C. Wallace at the University of Pennsylvania in the Center for Mitochondrial and Epigenomic Medicine, where his work examined mitochondrial genetics, epigenetics, and stress signaling. During his postdoctoral training, he also worked with Bruce McEwen at The Rockefeller University.

== Career and research ==
Picard has been on the faculty of Columbia University Irving Medical Center since 2015. At Columbia, Picard’s laboratory studies communication between mitochondria and the rest of the organism, including how psychosocial experiences, such as stress, may influence mitochondria and how mitochondrial biology may contribute to health, disease, and aging. He introduced the term “mitochondrial psychobiology” in 2019. His lab has studied how mitochondria operate like information processors involved in stress responses, communication, and other biological processes.

In 2015, he and his colleagues observed that individual mitochondria within a cell communicate with each other. Specifically, they form connections and exchange signals to align their inner membranes called cristae.

Picard has studied the role of mitochondria in regulating physiological responses to stress. He and collaborators also studied circulating mitochondrial DNA as a potential biological signal linked to psychological stress. They reported an association between acute psychological stress and increased mitochondrial DNA circulating in blood.

In addition, Picard has been involved in studies on the insertion of mitochondrial DNA into the genome in the nucleus of human cells. A study led by Picard and Ryan Mills (University of Michigan) reported that mitochondrial DNA insertions occur in human brain cells and may accumulate over a person’s lifetime. When cells were under stress, they accumulated mitochondrial DNA insertions faster.

Picard also contributed to research on the impacts of stress on hair graying as a model of aging. In 2021, Picard’s team reported that it is possible for human hair graying to be temporarily reversed, and hair graying is linked to life stress. They developed the Hair Pigmentation Pattern (HPP) technique, which was used to examine the associations between psychological stress, mitochondrial biology, and changes in hair pigmentation.

Picard has investigated mitochondrial variation across human brain regions and cell types. In 2025, he and collaborators published the MitoBrainMap, a map of mitochondrial biology in the human brain. They reported differences in mitochondrial number and function across brain regions and cell types, and brain regions that evolved more recently had evidence of a higher capacity for energy transformation.

He and colleagues reported that the metabolic hormones Growth Differentiation Factor 15 (GDF15) and Fibroblast growth factor 21 (FGF21) also respond to acute psychological stress, and they are related to a person’s broader psychological and social environments. Their data links the biology of metabolism and psychological stress.

Picard and colleagues have also developed methods for characterizing mitochondrial biology. In 2018, they introduced the mitochondrial health index, a measure for quantifying the capacity for mitochondrial energy-transformation in biological samples.

As Co-Directors of the Columbia Science of Health (SOH) Program, Picard and Alan Cohen are working with other researchers to generate, validate, and apply new ways to measure health as a biological state.

== Awards and recognition ==
In 2019, Picard was selected as the recipient for the Neal Miller New Investigator Award from the Academy of Behavioral Medicine Research for his research in the field. He received the 2021 Early Career Impact Award from the Federation of Associations in Behavioral & Brain Sciences (FABBS) in recognition of his contributions to basic science and translational research in mitochondrial psychobiology and stress biology. Picard also received the Herbert Weiner Early Career Award from the Society for Biopsychosocial Science and Medicine in 2023 for his early-career contributions to the field of psychosomatic medicine. In 2024, Picard was named the inaugural recipient of the $1.5 million Baszucki Prize in Science for his work connecting brain energetics, mitochondria, and the human experience.
