= Fragmentomics =

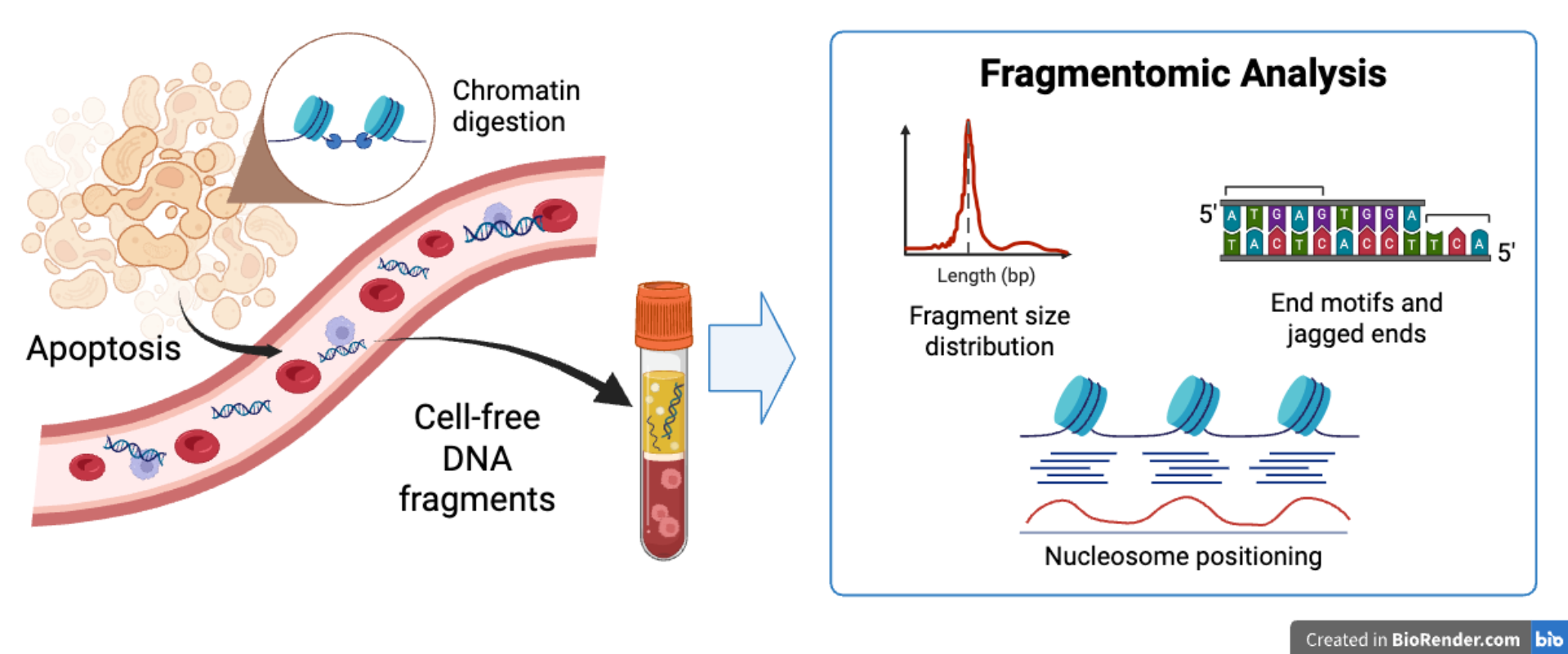
Overview of fragmentomics analysis. Characterizing the key features of DNA fragments can reveal information about underlying epigenetic and transcriptomic states. Fragment sizes reflect the non-random fragmentation of chromatin during apoptosis, leading to peaks in size distribution at ~167 bp and ~320 bp (the length of DNA around one and two nucleosomes, respectively). End motifs represent tetranucleotide sequences repeatedly generated during cleavage and provide insight into the activity of specific nucleases. Fragment sequence coverage can be used to infer the position of nucleosomes, revealing the chromatin architecture in the cell-of-origin.

Fragmentomics refers to the study of cell-free DNA (cfDNA) fragmentation patterns. Programmed cell death leads to the non-random fragmentation of DNA, and the resulting fragments can be released by cells into the blood as cell-free DNA. Using physical features such as size distribution, end motifs, and nucleosome positioning, cfDNA fragments can be profiled to infer epigenetic and transcriptional states. Differences in these features can identify fragments from particular sources, such as circulating tumour DNA (ctDNA) and cell-free fetal DNA (cffDNA). Furthermore, the cell of origin and mechanism of cfDNA release lead to specific fragmentation signatures, providing information about cell type, gene expression, cell physiology or pathology, or the action of treatment.

Although fragmentomic approaches have primarily been developed and validated using whole-genome sequencing data — which provides the depth and breadth of coverage needed to resolve subtle genome-wide patterns — their integration with targeted sequencing panels has gained increasing attention as a more clinically scalable alternative.

== History ==
cfDNA circulates in multiple body fluids but is most abundantly detected in blood plasma and serum. It is released from tissues through apoptosis, necrosis, and active secretion, and can exist either freely or associated to extracellular vesicles. In the bloodstream, cfDNA is highly fragmented and exhibits characteristic size profiles. cfDNA was first detected in 1948 by scientists Mandal and Metais in the blood serum of cancer patients. Decades later in the 1990s three big discoveries, made using PCR-based assays, revolutionized the understanding of cfDNA fragments. The first was the discovery of tumour cfDNA in cancer patients by detecting tumor specific variants (microsatellite repeats) in circulating plasma. The second was the detection of fetal cfDNA in pregnant women carrying male fetuses, achieved by identifying Y-chromosome markers in maternal plasma. The third was the detection of donor-specific cell-free DNA in the plasma of kidney and liver transplant recipients by identifying sex-mismatched genetic sequences (Y-chromosome markers).The term fragmentomics emerged in the 2010s to describe the study of the fragmentation patterns of cfDNA, with the complete structural and functional landscape of cfDNA fragments collectively referred to as the "fragmentome".

== Fragmentomic features ==
=== Fragment size distribution ===
Fragment size is highly dependent on the placement of histones on the DNA of cells undergoing apoptosis. During programmed cell death, DNA is degraded by caspase-activated DNAases. Nucleosomes protect DNA from digestion by DNAases, leading to cuts exclusively occurring at exposed sites between nucleosomes. This non-random, caspase-dependent cleavage is reflected in the fragment size distribution of cfDNA; the median size of cfDNA fragments is ~167 bp, representing the length of DNA wrapped around a single nucleosome. A smaller peak in the distribution is observed at ~320 bp, representing a dinucleosomal unit. Hudecova et al. reported the discovery of ultrashort plasma cell-free DNA (cfDNA) fragments, centred at approximately 50 base pairs. These ultrashort fragments are enriched in accessible chromatin regions and promoter sequences with G-quadruplex-forming potential. Their abundance differs between healthy individuals and patients with cancer.

Given the consistency in distribution, fragment size can be used to classify fragment type. Tumour-derived fragments tend to be shorter overall compared to normal cfDNA, with enrichment for fragment sizes between 90 and 150 bp. The ratio of short-to-long fragments can serve as a feature for early cancer detection and disease monitoring. Similarly, fetal cfDNA in maternal plasma is shorter than maternal cfDNA. The majority of cffDNA fragments are shorter than 300 bp, while roughly 20% of maternal cfDNA fragments are longer than 300 bp. Separating fragments by size and extracting those under 300 bp can help enrich for cffDNA.

=== End motifs ===
cfDNA fragments have been found to terminate at preferred nucleotide contexts, with particular tetranucleotide sequences being highly enriched at the ends of fragments. These end motifs are shaped by the nucleases responsible for cleavage, such as DFFB, DNASE1L3, and DNASE1. Plasma DNA fragment end motif frequencies have been shown to be affected by disease. For example, in a study of patients with hepatocellular carcinoma (HCC), patients with HCC had lower abundance of the CCCA fragment motif compared to healthy patients. Nuclease dysregulation can also cause changes in end motif frequency. Deletion of Dnase1l3 in mice led to the preferential cleavage of fragments, with the top six motifs all beginning with CC.

While some plasma DNA fragments are cleaved with blunt ends, other nucleases can produce jagged ends. Jagged ends refer to the asymmetry between the 5′ and 3′ termini on opposing strands where the cuts on DNA strands are often slightly offset, leading to overhangs. The degree and directionality of this jaggedness encodes information about the specific enzymatic mechanism of cleavage, with DNASE1 and DNASE1L3 leading to an increase and decrease in the frequency of jagged edges, respectively. Jagged ends have also been found to be more frequent in fetal DNA in maternal cfDNA and ctDNA in cancer patients.

=== Nucleosome positioning ===
cfDNA fragmentation patterns can reveal underlying nucleosome occupancy in the cell-of-origin. Nucleosome-protected DNA is resistant to cleavage by nucleases, so cuts primarily occur in nucleosome-depleted regions (NDR). Consequently, the ends of cfDNA fragments are strongly biased to fall within regions of linker DNA. Accessible genomic regions are areas of open chromatin that frequently contain actively bound transcription factor binding sites. By clustering fragments to specific genomic positions, the location of NDRs can be determined and quantified as a windowed protection score (WPS), which is the number of DNA fragments completely spanning a 120 bp genomic window minus those with endpoints inside it. Nucleosome organization can also be inferred from sequencing metrics, with a loss of sequencing coverage reflecting DNA degradation at unprotected binding sites and peaks of coverage occurring around nucleosome-protected regions.Nucleosome maps constructed from fragmentation patterns reflect chromatin state in the cell-of-origin and can reveal sites of active transcription. In oncology, nucleosome positioning can be leveraged for early screening and non-invasive cancer subtyping with ctDNA.

== Methods ==
=== Standard workflow ===
A standard fragmentomics workflow. Blood samples are taken for analysis from the source of interest (e.g., cancer patients, placenta), and DNA fragments are extracted from plasma or serum. The isolated fragments are constructed into libraries and subject to next-generation sequencing (NGS). The resulting sequences then undergo bioinformatic analysis with fragmentomic pipelines.

Fragmentomics analyses begin with peripheral blood draw, followed by the isolation of blood plasma and/or serum to obtain circulating cfDNA. Isolated cfDNA fragments then undergo next-generation sequencing (NGS). Sequencing data are then processed through bioinformatic pipelines to extract fragmentomic features and/or DNA methylation signals. This can then be used for tissue-of-origin deconvolution, and additional downstream analyses involving statistical and machine learning approaches.

=== EPIC-seq ===
EPIC-seq (Epigenetic Expression Inference from Cell-free DNA Sequencing) is a fragmentomics-based method that infers gene expression from cfDNA by analyzing fragmentation patterns at transcription start sites (TSS).

=== cfMeDIP-seq ===
cfMeDIP-seq (cell-free methylated DNA immunoprecipitation and high-throughput sequencing) is a fragment-based method used to profile DNA methylation patterns from cfDNA. DNA methylation, the addition of a methyl group to the 5′ position of cytosine residue (5mC), is a key epigenetic mechanism regulating gene expression, and its patterns are tissue- and cell-type specific. Changes in DNA methylation also reflect development, aging, environmental exposures, and disease states. In cfMeDIP-seq, cfDNA is first extracted from plasma and quantified despite its low input and fragment size (~167 bp due to nucleosome protection). In this assay, a 5mC antibody binds to the methylated fragments, enriching for methylated regions across the genome. Fragments are quantified using spike-in and filler DNA.

=== EM-seq ===
EM-seq (Enzymatic methyl sequencing) also profiles cfDNA methylation though enzymatic conversion. The method preserves cfDNA fragment length from degradation and provides high resolution information from low input amounts. In EM-seq, the 5mC and 5hmC is protected by TET family enzymes, then unmethylated cytosines are deaminated, thereby being read-out as thymines during sequencing.

=== Nanopore sequencing ===
Nanopore sequencing has emerged as an alternative platform for fragmentome analysis, enabling the direct characterization of circulating cell-free DNA (cfDNA) fragments without the short-fragment bias associated with short-read sequencing approaches. In 2023, van der Pol et al. introduced the ITSFASTR (InTegrated Sequence and Fragmentome AnalysiS Time Reduction) workflow, demonstrating that Oxford Nanopore Technologies sequencing can simultaneously generate genomic and fragmentomic information from plasma and urine cfDNA within 24 hours of sample collection. The approach was shown to recover canonical fragmentomic features, including fragment-size distributions, fragment-end motifs, and nucleosome positioning patterns, while also enabling the analysis of longer cfDNA molecules that are often underrepresented in short-read datasets.

== Limitations ==
Despite its utility, fragmentomics faces some notable limitations. Biologically, plasma cfDNA is a composite signal from multiple tissues, and at low tumour fractions (i.e., <1%, as often seen in early stage cancer), tumour-derived fragmentomic signals are overwhelmed by background noise from normal cells, making reliable detection difficult without high sensitivity. Fragmentomics is also constrained by sequencing depth. Many fragmentomic features (particularly nucleosome positioning at specific loci) require high-coverage whole-genome sequencing, which remains costly and limits clinical scalability. While targeted panels enable deeper sequencing, they limit information to a select few genomic regions and miss global fragmentation patterns.

== Applications ==
=== Tissue-of-origin detection ===
cfDNA fragments carry signatures reflecting their tissue-of-origin. The tissue and cell-type contributions of circulating cfDNA fragments can be computationally inferred in a process called cfDNA deconvolution. Fragmentomic features can be quantified by calculating statistical scores at defined genomic loci for predictable characteristics such as fragment size distributions, fragment end motifs, strand orientation, fragment convergence patterns, and nucleosomal positioning around TSSs. These fragmentation signatures are then used to reconstruct chromatin accessibility landscapes and computationally correlated with reference epigenomic maps and cell atlases to rank candidate tissues and cells-of-origin.

=== Cancer detection and tumour profiling ===
Liquid biopsies are increasingly being used for cancer profiling, where tumour-derived DNA is analyzed to detect somatic variants, monitor disease progression, assess minimal residual disease, and guide targeted therapy decisions. Plasma DNA fragments from tumour cells tend to be shorter and have different end motif profiles compared to cell-free DNA from normal cells, improving the identification of tumour DNA. Fragmentomics has been applied to several areas of cancer care, including early detection, monitoring, and subtyping.

=== Non-invasive prenatal testing ===
In prenatal medicine, cfDNA analysis is widely used for fetal sex determination and non-invasive prenatal testing (NIPT), including parent-of-origin and haplotype-based analyses using paternal SNPs. However, the availability of fetal cfDNA in maternal cfDNA is low, comprising only 2–19% of the total volume. Since all cffDNA is less than 300 bp long, selecting for fragments by size can help enrich for fetal DNA.

=== Transplant rejection detection ===
While organ transplants are often life saving procedures, their efficacy and success are threatened by the possibility of rejection. Identifying rejection responses early is critical to save the graft, prevent irreversible damage, and provide treatment in a timely manner. Donor-derived cell-free DNA (ddcfDNA) has been developed as a biomarker of graft integrity, and fragmentomics can be applied to detect transplant rejection. A previous study found that patients who experience acute rejection had higher ddcfDNA concentrations and showed enrichment for fragments between 100 and 250 bp.

=== Biomarker discovery ===
cfDNA is increasingly investigated as a biomarker in neurodegenerative diseases such as Alzheimer's disease and Parkinson's disease, as well as in autoimmune, cardiovascular, and inflammatory conditions, where tissue-specific methylation patterns can reveal the cell of origin. In obstetrics, placental cfDNA dynamics are being studied in pregnancy complications such as preeclampsia.
