= EPIC-Seq =

Cell-free DNA profiling method

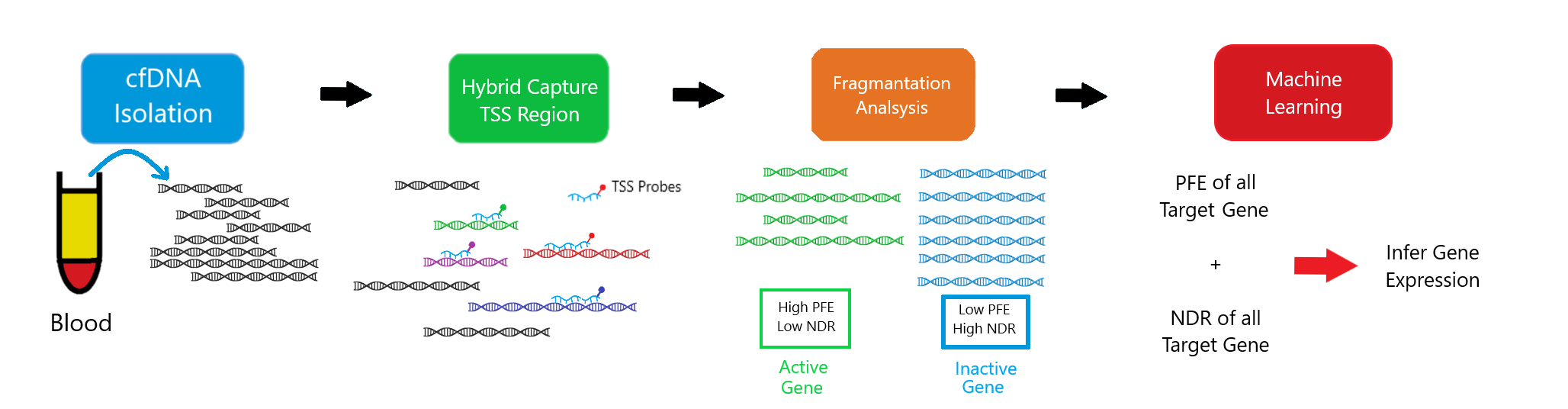
Fig 1.This flowchart delineates the workflow for EPIC-Seq, a comprehensive method for analyzing cell-free DNA (cfDNA). The initial step involves extracting cfDNA from patients' plasma through liquid biopsy. Subsequently, the process advances to capturing reads within the Transcription Start Site (TSS) region of targeted genes utilizing specialized probes, ensuring precise genomic coverage. Once the cfDNA within the TSS region of targeted genes is captured, the next phase involves computing Fragmentomic Features such as promoter fragmentation entropy (PFE) and the Depth at nucleosome-depleted regions (NDR), providing insights into the structural characteristics of the DNA fragments. Finally, leveraging the NDR and PFE of all targets as features, a machine learning model is constructed to infer gene expression profiles in patients, facilitating the interpretation of molecular signatures and aiding in diagnostic and prognostic assessments.

EPIC-seq, (short for Epigenetic Expression Inference by Cell-free DNA Sequencing), is a high-throughput method that specifically targets gene promoters using cell-free DNA (cfDNA) sequencing. By employing non-invasive techniques such as blood sampling, it infers the expression levels of targeted genes. It consists of both wet and dry lab stages.

EPIC-seq involves deep sequencing of the transcription start sites (TSS). It hypothesizes that with deep sequencing of these TSSs, usage of fragmentomic features, chromatin fragmentation patterns or properties, can allow high-resolution analyses, as opposed to its alternatives.

The method has been shown effective for gene-level expression inference, molecular subtyping of diffuse large B cell lymphoma (DLBCL), histological classification of nonsmall-cell lung cancer (NSCLC), evaluation of results of immunotherapy agents, and assessment of the genes' prognostic importance. EPIC-seq uses machine learning to deduce the RNA expression of the genes and proposes two new metrics: promoter fragmentation entropy (PFE), an adjusted Shannon Index for entropy, and nucleosome-depleted region (NDR) score, the depth of sequencing in NDR regions. PFE showed superior performance compared to earlier metrics for fragmentomic features.

Additionally, EPIC-seq has been mentioned as a possible solution for detecting tissue damage and esophagus cancer using methylation profiles of cfDNAs, profiling of donor liver molecular networks, and inflammatory bowel disease (IBD) detection.

== Background ==
=== Historical Usage of cfDNA and fragmentomic features ===
cfDNA, cell death-related and chromatin fragmented DNA molecules contained in blood plasma, has been used to detect transplant tissue rejection, prenatal fetal aneuploidy testing, tumour profiling, and early cancer detection in previous research. Nevertheless, prevalent liquid biopsy methods for cfDNA profiling depend on detecting germline or somatic genetic variations, which may be absent even in high disease burden-bearing patients and cancers with high tumour mutation rates.

Historically, the usage of fragmentomic features of cfDNA samples was shown to be another method to approach the problems mentioned. They demonstrated the capability to inform about the originated tissue classification of cfDNA molecules, which can help segregate tumour-related somatic mutations. However, current methods that use fragmentomic features, such as shallow whole genome sequencing (WGS) on cfDNA, do not fully cover all the tissues' effects and provide low sequencing depth and breadth to infer low-level, for example, gene level, properties. Hence, these methods require a high tumour burden from the patients.

=== Circulating Tumor DNA profiling ===
Circulating tumour DNA (ctDNA) molecules are tumour-derived cell-free DNA (cfDNA) circulating in the bloodstream and are not associated with cells. CtDNA primarily arises from chromatin fragmentation accompanying tumour cell death and can be extracted by liquid biopsy. CtDNA analysis has been implemented for noninvasive identification of tumour genetic characteristics and early recognition of various cancer forms. The majority of current ctDNA analysis depends on genetic differences in germline or somatic cells to diagnose diseases and detect tumour cells at an early stage. While looking at genetic variations of ctDNA can be beneficial, not all ctDNAs contain genetic mutations. EPIC-seq unitized epigenetic features of ctDNA to inform tissue-of-origin of these unmutated molecules, which is helpful for cancer classification.

=== Fragmentomic Features for Tissue-of-origin classification ===
The majority of circulating cfDNA molecules are fragments linked to nucleosomes, so they represent unique chromatin arrangements found in the nuclear genomes of the cells they originate from. In particular, open chromatin areas j, whereas genomic regions linked to nucleosomal complexes are often shielded from endonuclease activity. Several studies have identified specific chromatin fragmentomic characteristics that aid in informing tissue origins through cfDNA profiling. These features include:

1. Reduced sequencing coverage depth
2. Disruption of nucleosome positioning near transcription start sites (TSSs)
3. Length of cfDNA fragments

== Principles of EPIC-seq ==
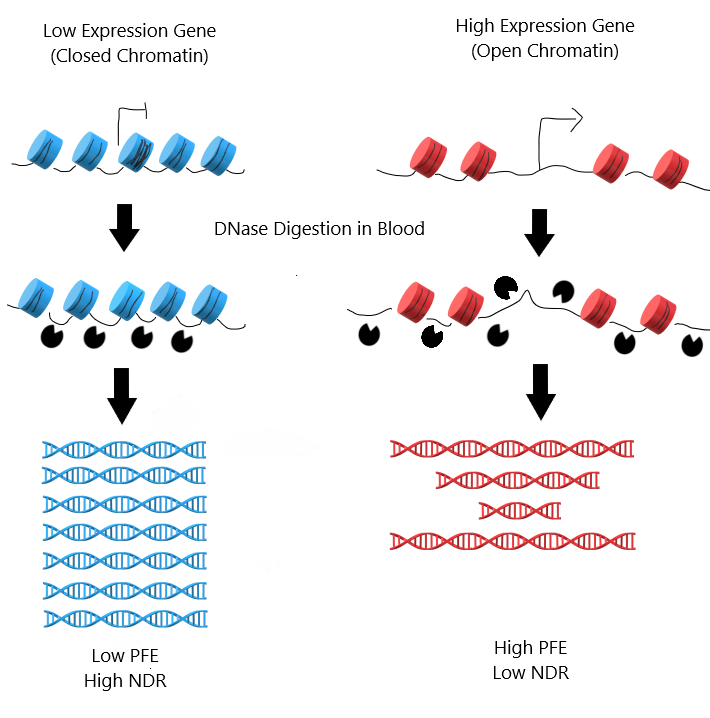
Fig 2. Diagram explaining Promoter Fragmentation Entropy (PFE) and Nucleosome Depleted Region (NDR)

Currently, the majority of circulating tumour DNA (ctDNA) fragmentomic techniques lack the ability to achieve gene-level resolution and are effective mainly in inferring expression at elevated ctDNA levels. Consequently, they are primarily applicable to patients with notably advanced tumour burdens typically seen in late-stage cancer.

To address this limitation, EPIC-seq employs hybrid capture-based targeted deep sequencing of regions flanking transcription start sites (TSS) in cfDNA. This approach allows for the acquisition of ctDNA fragmentation features crucial for predicting gene expressions, such as Promoter Fragmentation Entropy (PFE) and Nucleosome Depleted Region (NDR). These key fragmentomic features possess the capability to capture associations at the gene level with expression levels throughout the genome, enabling the construction of a predictive model for transcriptional output. This would allows for the high-resolution monitoring of cfDNA fragmentation and gene-level analysis.

=== Promoter Fragmentation entropy ===
Epic-seq hypothesizes that cfDNA fragments originating from active promoters, which are less shielded by nucleosomes and thus more susceptible to endonuclease cleavage, will display more erratic cleavage patterns compared to fragments from inactive promoters, which are better protected by nucleosomes. PFE is a variation of the Shannon Index, which is a quantitative measure for estimating diversity. In the context of Epic-seq, PFE calculates the diversity of cfDNA fragment lengths where both ends of the fragment are situated within the 2 kb flanking region of each gene's TSS. The higher the PFE of a gene's TSS, the more likely the gene is highly expressed.

=== Nucleosome Depleted region ===
Actively expressed genes have open chromatin at their TSS region, they are less shielded by nucleosomes and, therefore, more susceptible to endonuclease cleavage. Consequently, the depth of cfDNA originating from the TSS of active genes tends to be shallower compared to that of inactive genes. NDR quantifies the normalized depth within each 2-kilobase window surrounding each TSS. The lower the NDR of a gene TSS site, the more likely the gene is highly expressed.

== Methods ==
=== Wet Lab workflow ===
==== 1. Collection and Processing of plasma ====
Peripheral blood samples were obtained and processed to isolate plasma following standard protocols. Upon centrifugation, plasma specimens were preserved at −80 °C, awaiting the extraction of ctDNA. The extraction of cfDNA from plasma volumes ranging from 2 to 16 ml was carried out using established laboratory procedures. Following isolation, the concentration of cfDNA was determined using fluorescence-based quantification methods.

==== 2. Sequencing Library preparation ====
A typical amount of 32 ng of cfDNA was utilized for library preparation. DNA input was adjusted to mitigate the effects of high molecular-weight DNA contamination. The library preparation process encompassed end repair, A-tailing, and adapter ligation, which also incorporated molecular barcodes into each read. These procedures were conducted according to ligation based library preparation standardized protocols, with overnight ligation performed at 4 °C. Following this, shotgun cfDNA libraries underwent hybrid capture targeting specific genomic regions, as detailed below.

==== 3. Custom Capture Panels sequencing ====
Custom capture panels tailored to specific cancer types or personalized selectors were utilized in EPIC-seq. The capture panels targeted transcription start site regions of genes of interest. Enrichment for EPIC-seq was performed following established laboratory protocols. Subsequently, hybridization captures were pooled, and the pooled samples underwent sequencing using short read sequencing.

=== Dry Lab workflow ===
Since EPIC-seq contains certain computational parts after the wet-lab portion for further processing, the following steps are summarized based on the developers' steps provided in the original paper.

==== 4. Demultiplexing and Error correction ====
If multiplexed paired-end sequencing is used, then demultiplexing needs to be done to sort reads for different samples to different files. After the demultiplexing, error correction and read pair elimination based on unique identifier and barcode matching of pairs can be done. Developers adapt the demultiplexing and error correction steps from the CAPP-seq demultiplexing pipeline.

==== 5. Outer Sequence Removal and trimming ====
For the preservation of shorter fragment reads, barcode removal and adapter trimming need to be done. After read preprocessing, the alignment of reads to the human genome reference should be performed. Original EPIC-seq used hg19 but for better results, an updated version of human genome reference can be used. One should be careful about their aligner's options since some aligners can interfere with the inclusion of shorter reads paired with longer ones. For the deduplication, attached molecular customized barcodes should be exploited. These barcodes include endogenous and exogenous unique molecular identifiers (UMIs) and are handy for distinguishing Polymerase Chain Reaction (PCR) duplicates from real duplicates and hence for PCR duplicate cleansing. This portion is especially important for oncologic applications since the low mutation abundance can be suppressed by PCR duplicates.

==== 6. Read Normalization and quality control ====
If the data for different samples are going to be contrasted with each other, one can perform downsampling on the reads to achieve comparability. The reported sequencing coverage depth for reasonable analysis results was reported as bigger than 500 folds, thus any sample whose mean sequencing depth does not exceed the number can be dropped for more accurate outcomes. Also, EPIC-seq uses estimated expected cfDNA fragment length density of 140–185, based on chromatosomal length. The samples that have outlier fragment length density can be dropped for higher correlation results. As the last quality control step, mapping quality should be considered. A looser threshold can be dictated on EPIC-seq reads, compared to WGS, due to the TSS selection criteria imposed during design phases making the reads more unique for EPIC-seq.

==== Fragmentomic Feature Analysis ====
===== 7. Shannon's entropy =====
For the measurement of the diversity of fragmentomic features, the PFE metric, derived from Shannon's Index of entropy, is developed. The default number of 201 bins of lengths 100 to 300 are used for density estimation by the maximum likelihood method. The probability of having a fragment with size $99+i$, ($\hat{p_i}$) is computed by the division of the number of fragments with size $99+i$ by the total number of fragments. Shannon's entropy is calculated with the formula: $- \sum_{i=1}^{201}(\hat{p_i}\log_2(\hat{p_i}))$.

===== 8. Dirichlet-Multionomial model =====
Next, as a cleansing against different sequencing depths from different runs and other factors that can hinder the fragment length distribution sanity, Bayesian normalization via the Dirichlet-multinomial model should be done. Per every sample, based on the fragment lengths observed in that sample, a multinomial maximum likelihood estimation-based fragment length distribution is generated. Two intervals of 250 base pair length are used, located between -1000th base pair and -750th base pair, and between 750th base pair and 1000th base pair locations to the centre of TSS. This is done due to the prevention of the impact of gene expression on the generated distribution, as the selected intervals are relatively far away from TSS. Then, the fragment length densities from that distribution are sampled for each 201-fragment size and used as a parameter for Dirichlet distribution generation.

The initial parameter for Dirichlet distribution is set to 20. From the obtained Dirichlet distribution, 2000 fragments are sampled, and Shannon's entropy is calculated for those. The Shannon entropies are subsequently compared with the Shannon entropy values of five randomly selected background sets ($e_i$ where $1\le i \le5$).

===== 9. PFE calculation =====
PFE is calculated as the probability of gene-specific entropy being higher than $(1+k)$ times all other background set entropies individually. The variable $k$ is sampled from the Gamma distribution with shape 1 and rate 0.5. Also, as the last step, the expected value for the sum of gene-specific entropy probability for each background is reported as PFE. That probability is based on the Dirichlet distribution generated in the previous step.

===== 10. NDR calculation =====
NDR is the normalized measure of sequencing depth, which was downsampled to 2000 folds as a default in the 2000 base pair windows during read preprocessing and quality control steps.

==== 11. Machine Learning for Expression prediction ====
With deep WGS data of cfDNA from a carcinoma of unknown primary patient with very low ctDNA concentration quantified, they trained a machine learning model using bootstrapping. The results of RNA-sequencing on PBMC runs for the 5 different patients are recorded and the average of 3 of these individuals' expression levels is used as a reference for gene expression. The genes are clustered into 10 clusters based on reference gene expression to increase the resolution at the core promoters. Then, genes used as a background value for PFE calculation are removed. Next, all the fragments in extended TSS regions, a region that has the center as TSS regions' center and the length of 2000 base pairs, are pooled. The PFE and NDR scores are calculated for the fragments pooled. Further normalization of these scores is done based on their 95th percentile.

Using these two features, they bootstrapped, used in a weighted fashion, 600 expression prediction models developed for WGS data. Among those models, there are 200 univariable standalone NDR, 200 univariable standalone PFE, and 200 NDR-PFE integrated models.

== Advantages ==
=== High throughputness ===
EPIC-seq inherits the advantages of high-throughput sequencing: fast sequencing times, high scalability, higher sequencing depths, lower costs, and low error rates. Another advantage of EPIC-seq is that it is non-invasive. This also eliminates the risks of invasive methods done over risky tissues and allows scientists to study tissues that are too dangerous or difficult to do so.

=== Independency of High Tumour Burden requirement ===
As mentioned in the introduction, two major limitations of the predecessor methods are not inherited by EPIC-Seq: germline or somatic variant dependency of common liquid biopsy methods which is also not certain to be found even in high-disease burden patients and methods like shallow WGS's insufficient range of cfDNA tissue consideration, genomic breadth and genomic depth which causes low-resolution and level of inference of gene expression and, again, requires high tumour burden for higher resolution. EPIC-seq uses fragmentomic features instead of variant calling, thus it is not bound by the existence of the variation. Also, since it does targeted sequencing instead of whole genome, it allows scientists to increase the sequencing depth and hence provide a better resolution. Moreover, it also provides more sensitive and comprehensive tissue-of-origin information.

=== Different Prediction sensitivities ===
Furthermore, the method showed consistent performance in cancer identification, classification, and treatment effect problems like NSCLC and DLBCL identification, histological classification of subtypes of NSCLC, molecular classification of subtypes of DLBCL, DLBCL COO detection, programmed death-ligand 1 immune-checkpoint inhibition response prediction against advanced NSCLC cases, and prognostic value detection of individual genes.

=== Generalizability ===
WES was done with EPIC-seq and it detected a correlation between the biological signal and active genes' exonic regions; this shows that EPIC-seq can be generalized for expression of genes of interest rather than only cancer genes

=== Robustness on cfDNA levels ===
In general, EPIC-seq analysis results showed a significant correlation between the inspected biological effect and the developed score. For the classification tasks Area Under the ROC (receiver operating characteristic curve) Curve (AUC) scores were over 90% with a sufficient significance interval. Also, for these tasks, cfDNA levels did not change the performance unfavourably even when the levels were below 1%. So, the method shows a good robustness against cfDNA levels as well. Finally, EPIC-seq did not show any significant changes under different pre-analytical factors, which proves that the method is robust under different circumstances that can be caused by the instruments and tools used before the analysis.

== Limitations ==
While EPIC-seq offers significant potential in various biomedical applications, it also has limitations that warrant consideration in its implementation and interpretation.

=== Dependency on Known Cancer-Associated genes ===
One limitation of EPIC-seq is its reliance on prior knowledge of genes associated with specific cancers. The effectiveness of the EPIC-seq model hinges on the availability of comprehensive gene expression profiles for the targeted cancer types. This dependency may restrict its applicability to cancers with well-characterized gene expression patterns, limiting its utility in cancers with less understood molecular signatures.

=== Limited applicability to specific cancer types ===
EPIC-seq may be more effective in cancers with prominent genes or well-defined molecular subtypes. Consequently, its utility may be limited in cancers with less distinct genetic profiles or those characterized by significant interpatient variability. This restricts its generalizability across different cancer types and necessitates cautious interpretation of results in diverse oncological contexts.

=== Limited Performance in Early-stage cancer ===
EPIC-seq may exhibit enhanced performance in detecting late-stage cancer due to higher levels of ctDNA and more pronounced genetic alterations. For example, EPIC-seq's sensitivity for detecting NSCLC diminishes significantly in patients with low tumor-DNA burden (below 1%), resulting in decreased detection rates by approximately 34%.

== Applications ==
=== Noninvasive cancer detection ===
EPIC-seq has demonstrated remarkable potential in noninvasive cancer detection, notably in the diagnosis of lung cancer, the leading cause of cancer-related mortality. Using EPIC-seq, researchers have achieved high accuracy in distinguishing between NSCLC patients, DLBCL patients and healthy individuals.

=== Noninvasive Classification of Cancer subtypes ===
EPIC-seq enables the subclassification of NSCLC into histological subtypes such as lung adenocarcinoma (LUAD) and lung squamous cell carcinoma (LUSC). EPIC-seq can also aid with the classification of cell-of-origin (COO) subtypes in DLBCL.

=== Therapeutic Response prediction ===
In addition to diagnosis and classification, EPIC-seq holds promise in predicting patient response to various cancer therapies, including immune-checkpoint inhibition (ICI). By analyzing changes in gene expression patterns captured through EPIC-seq, researchers can forecast patient response to PD-(L)1 blockade therapy, which can provide great help in personalized cancer treatment. EPIC-seq-derived indices have shown significant correlation with treatment response, offering potential prognostic markers for therapy outcome prediction.

=== Immunotranscriptomic profiling of Classical Hodgkin Lymphoma ===
EPIC-seq has been shown to be effective for inferral of epigenetic expression of classical Hodgkin Lymphoma's (cHL) subtypes. Hodgkin and Reed/Sternberg cells and their corresponding T cells' expression were inferred with EPIC-seq. Bulk single-cell RNA sequencing results shows significant correlation with EPIC-seq profilings of these cell types.

=== Possible use cases ===
Research in different areas mention possible use cases of EPIC-seq. Integrated analysis toolkit for whole-genome-wide features of cfDNA (INAC) compiles different tools, including EPIC-seq's PFE and NDR scores, to provide in comprehensive silico analysis of cfDNA which can be exemplified disease state and clinical outcome inference, transcriptome modeling, and copy number profiling. EPIC-seq is also mentioned to be a potential application in clinica IBD cases. It can be used for survailance of IBD in high-risk groups and precancerous development caused by IBD. It is also named as a possible superior method in clinical IBD gut damage detection, compared to the current methods.

== Alternatives ==
As EPIC-seq studies epigenetic markers to infer gene expression, one can study epigenetic sequencing methods like ChIP-seq, ATAC-seq, MeDIP-seq, and Bisulfite-Free DNA Methylation sequencing in combination with methods for profiling RNA expression such as RNA-seq and scRNA-seq.

Considering the method is mainly developed for early cancer detection or subgrouping, liquid biopsy methods, such as Twist cfDNA Pan-Cancer Reference Standard, can be used as an alternative. Different liquid biopsy methods focus on cell-free tumour markers, tumour methylation markers, exomes, proteins, lipids, carbohydrates, electrolytes, metabolites, RNA, extracellular vesicles, circulating tumour cells, and tumour-educated platelets for early identification of cancer non-invasively. Some of the proposed liquid biopsy methods provide a comprehensive detection of cancer types, such as ATR-FTIR spectroscopy and CancerSEEK, while others, like Dxcover and SelectMdx operate on more specific (even single) cancer targets.

EPIC-seq utilizes fragmentomic features to infer expression levels of genes. Several studies also employ fragmentomic features to infer cancer existence, infer cell death, and detect other clinical conditions such as transplant failure.

=== ctDNA by Fragment Size analysis ===
This method uses in vivo and in silico ctDNA fragment length selection to enrich the variant proportion in the plasma. The method is decided on size selection criteria based on blood ctDNA fragment length properties, so it may not generalize well for other non-invasive sampling methods. Furthermore, it employs supervised machine learning methods like Random Forest and Logistic Regression on shallow WGS to classify cancer and healthy patients. The method can be used for different cancer types.

=== Plasma DNA End-Motif profiling ===
This method tries to identify 4-bp long end motifs from each stand's 5' end on bisulfite sequencing reads of plasma cfDNAs. Hierarchical clustering of the motifs is done to detect any under/overrepresentation of these motifs due to cancer existence. The method incorporates Support Vector Machines and Logistic Regression to predict cancer patients from healthy ones. The method is also applied to transplant patients with clustering and multidimensional scaling (MDS) analysis and shows applicability. The same analysis types also proved that this method applies to prenatal testing. This method is also informative for cell type origins.

=== Orientation-aware Plasma cell-free DNA Fragmentation analysis ===
Sequencing depth inconsistencies on open chromatin regions and signals derived from up/downstream orientation-sensitive sequencing read densities, this method infers the tissue of origin of the cfDNA fragments obtained from bisulfite sequencing. The method uses a mathematical formulation to generate signals for orientation-aware cfDNA fragmentation based on the empirical peak periods and positions of up/downstream ends of the reads. The method shown to be useful for inferring the tissue-of-origin, pregnancy identification, cancer detection, and transplant monitoring. This method also provides information on which tissue-of-origin contributes how much to cfDNA reads.

=== DNA Evaluation of Fragments for early interception ===
The method analyzes the shallow WGS reads in windows while considering the cfDNA fragment length and coverage. The genome-wide pattern of cfDNA fragmentation features is then fed to a gradient tree-boosting machine learning model to predict their cancer situation. They also used machine learning classifiers to predict the tissue of origin. Overall, the method can be used to identify if a patient has cancer. Even though the method does not specifically classify the cancer types during prediction, it is used for the detection of different cancers.

=== In vivo Nucleosome footprinting ===
The method produces genome-wide mappings of in vivo nucleosome occupancy to detect the tissue-of-origin of cfDNA molecules. The method uses reads' endpoint position aligned which are expected to be close to nucleosome core particle (NCP) sites. Windowed Protection Score (WPS) is proposed to quantify the cfDNA density close to NCPs using the frequency of cfDNA particles that cover 120 base pairs centred at a given location minus the frequency of fragments with an endpoint at the same interval. Then, the peaks are called heuristically for WPS to identify footprints. The cells contributing to cfDNA are then predicted from the footprints. These footprints can be used for identifying non-malignant epigenetic or genetic sites like transcription factor binding sites, and detection of malignancy-related biomarkers based on the extent of tissue damage and cell deaths.

=== ctDNA Nucleosome Pattern Employment for Transcriptional Regulation profiling ===
The method has mainly been developed for detecting the various phenotypes of metastatic castration-resistant prostate cancer. It requires the usage of patient-derived xenografts for enrichment of ctDNA in blood for further analysis. After WGS, the method utilizes the tool Griffin for inspection of local promoter coverage, nucleosome positioning, fragment size analysis, and composite transcription factor binding sites plus open chromatin sites of ctDNA reads. It also checks the histone modifications and applies dimensionality reduction on the found sites to identify putative promoter, enhancer, and gene repressive heterochromatic marks. To interrogate the chromatine phasing, distance between open chromatin regions, the method uses TritonNP, newly developed software, that uses Fourier transforms and band-pass filters. XGBoost is utilized for classification on cancer subtype with using the features detected in previous steps.

=== cfDNA Methylation, Copy Number, and Fragmentation Analysis for early detection of multiple cancer types ===
The method is proposed as an assay that employs both cfDNA whole genome methylation sequencing and fragmentomic feature information for multicancer classification. Copy number ratios calculated for healthy and cancerous tissues are used as a cancer type and cancer existence identifier. As done in EPIC-seq, the method also utilizes fragment lengths. Short fragment over long fragment ratio is used in the method as an identifier score. Using the single base or region level methylation percentages on detected cancer methylation markers for each cancer type, copy number ratios, and short/long fragment ratios; the method employs a custom Support Vector Machines algorithm to classify the cancer type if there exists one. This method reports the cancer detection and tissue-of-origin of 4 cancer types. However, it requires detection of specific methylation sites/regions of interest for cancer types
