= EGFR =

EGFR may refer to:

- Epidermal growth factor receptor (EGFR), a transmembrane receptor protein in humans
- Estimated glomerular filtration rate (eGFR), a measure of renal function
