= MMP10 =

Protein-coding gene in the species Homo sapiens

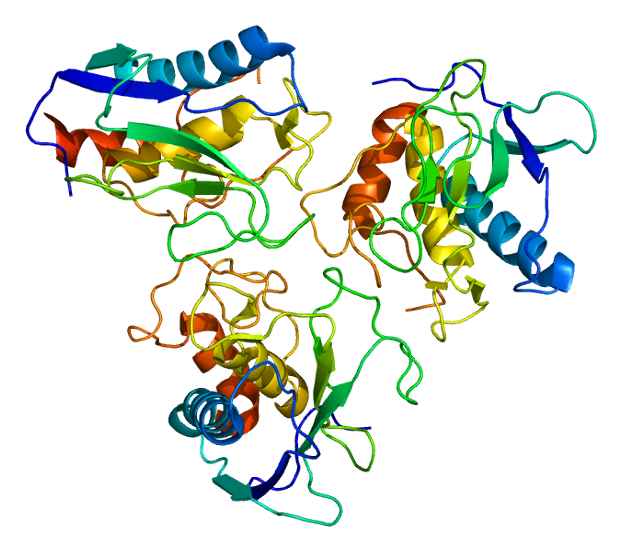
Available structures
PDB	Ortholog search: PDBe RCSB
PDB	List of PDB id codes 1Q3A, 3V96, 4ILW

Identifiers
- Aliases: MMP10, SL-2, STMY2, matrix metallopeptidase 10
- External IDs: OMIM: 185260; MGI: 97007; HomoloGene: 20546; GeneCards: MMP10; OMA:MMP10 - orthologs
- EC number: 3.4.24.22

Gene location (Human)
Chr.	Chromosome 11 (human)
Band	11q22.2	Start	102,770,502 bp
Band	11q22.2	End	102,780,628 bp

Gene location (Mouse)
Chr.	Chromosome 9 (mouse)
Band	9|9 A1	Start	7,502,353 bp
Band	9|9 A1	End	7,510,241 bp
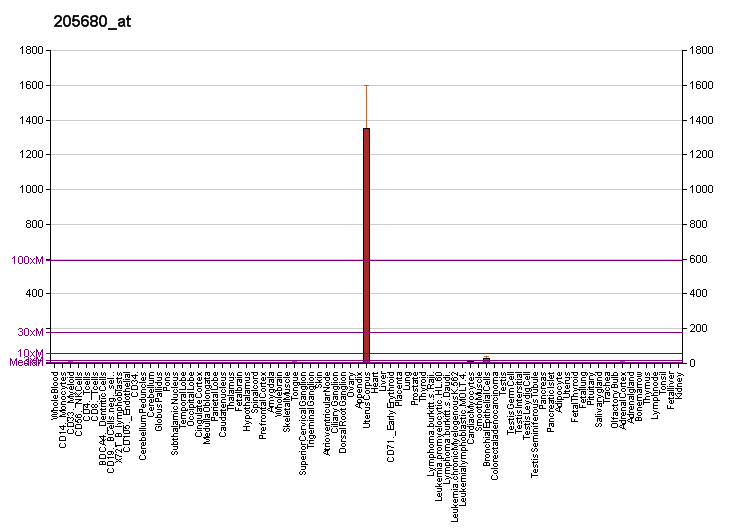
RNA expression pattern
Bgee	Human / Mouse (ortholog); Top expressed in: mucosa of paranasal sinus; olfactory zone of nasal mucosa; palpebral conjunctiva; nasal epithelium; cartilage tissue; islet of Langerhans; epithelium of nasopharynx; stromal cell of endometrium; pancreatic epithelial cell; decidua / Top expressed in: duodenum; jejunum; Paneth cell; integument; decidua; ileum; colon; ovary; muscle of leg; uterus; More reference expression data
BioGPS	More reference expression data
Gene ontology
Molecular function	zinc ion binding; peptidase activity; metalloendopeptidase activity; hydrolase activity; metallopeptidase activity; metal ion binding; serine-type endopeptidase activity
Cellular component	extracellular region; extracellular space; extracellular matrix
Biological process	collagen catabolic process; extracellular matrix disassembly; regulation of cell migration; proteolysis; response to hypoxia; extracellular matrix organization
Sources:Amigo / QuickGO
Orthologs
Species	Human	Mouse
Entrez	4319	17384
Ensembl	ENSG00000166670	ENSMUSG00000047562
UniProt	P09238	O55123
RefSeq (mRNA)	NM_002425	NM_019471
RefSeq (protein)	NP_002416	NP_062344
Location (UCSC)	Chr 11: 102.77 – 102.78 Mb	Chr 9: 7.5 – 7.51 Mb
PubMed search
- Wikidata
View/Edit Human	View/Edit Mouse

Stromelysin-2 also known as matrix metalloproteinase-10 (MMP-10) or transin-2 is an enzyme that in humans is encoded by the MMP10 gene.

== Function ==
Proteins of the matrix metalloproteinase (MMP) family are involved in the breakdown of extracellular matrix in normal physiological processes, such as embryonic development, reproduction, and tissue remodeling, as well as in disease processes, such as arthritis and metastasis. Most MMPs are secreted as inactive proproteins which are activated when cleaved by extracellular proteinases. The enzyme encoded by this gene degrades proteoglycans and fibronectin. The gene is part of a cluster of MMP genes which localize to chromosome 11q22.3.

== Clinical significance ==
MMP10 has been linked to cancer stem cell vitality and metastasis.

MMP10 is a potential prognostic biomarker for oral cancer.
