= BCAS1 =

Protein-coding gene in humans

Identifiers
- Aliases: BCAS1, AIBC1, NABC1, breast carcinoma amplified sequence 1, brain enriched myelin associated protein 1, PMES-2
- External IDs: OMIM: 602968; MGI: 1924210; HomoloGene: 2714; GeneCards: BCAS1; OMA:BCAS1 - orthologs

Gene location (Human)
Chr.	Chromosome 20 (human)
Band	20q13.2	Start	53,936,777 bp
Band	20q13.2	End	54,070,594 bp

Gene location (Mouse)
Chr.	Chromosome 2 (mouse)
Band	2|2 H3	Start	170,188,911 bp
Band	2|2 H3	End	170,269,765 bp
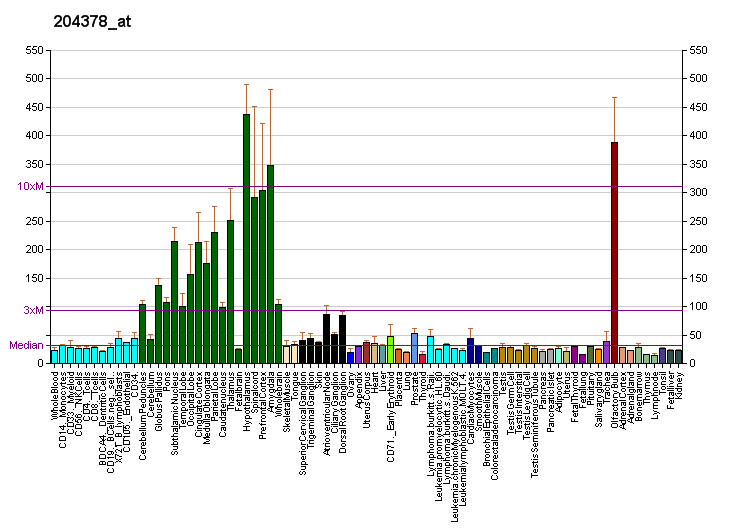
RNA expression pattern
Bgee	Human / Mouse (ortholog); Top expressed in: C1 segment; inferior ganglion of vagus nerve; corpus callosum; ventral tegmental area; superior vestibular nucleus; middle frontal gyrus; pons; internal globus pallidus; optic nerve; amygdala / Top expressed in: deep cerebellar nuclei; substantia nigra; pontine nuclei; globus pallidus; lateral geniculate nucleus; suprachiasmatic nucleus; sciatic nerve; ventral tegmental area; anterior horn of spinal cord; medial geniculate nucleus; More reference expression data
BioGPS	More reference expression data
Orthologs
Species	Human	Mouse
Entrez	8537	76960
Ensembl	ENSG00000064787	ENSMUSG00000013523
UniProt	O75363	Q80YN3
RefSeq (mRNA)	NM_003657; NM_001316361; NM_001323347; NM_001366295; NM_001366296 NM_001366297; NM_001366298	NM_001164369; NM_029815
RefSeq (protein)	NP_001303290; NP_001310276; NP_003648; NP_001353224; NP_001353225 NP_001353226; NP_001353227	NP_001157841; NP_084091
Location (UCSC)	Chr 20: 53.94 – 54.07 Mb	Chr 2: 170.19 – 170.27 Mb
PubMed search
- Wikidata
View/Edit Human	View/Edit Mouse

Breast carcinoma-amplified sequence 1 is a protein that in humans is encoded by the BCAS1 gene.

Breast carcinoma amplified sequence 1 (BCAS1) was isolated from a region at 20q13 which is amplified in a variety of tumor types and associated with more aggressive tumor phenotypes. Among the genes identified from this region, BCAS1 was found to be highly expressed in three amplified breast cancer cell lines and in one breast tumor without amplification at 20q13.2. However, the BCAS1 gene is not in the common region of maximal amplification and its expression was not detected in the breast cancer cell line MCF7, in which this region is highly amplified. Although not consistently expressed, BCAS1 is a candidate oncogene. It is predicted to encode a protein of 584 amino acids with no significant homology to other proteins.
