= TSPAN13 =

Protein-coding gene in humans

Identifiers
- Aliases: TSPAN13, NET-6, NET6, TM4SF13, tetraspanin 13
- External IDs: OMIM: 613139; MGI: 1913359; GeneCards: TSPAN13

Gene location (Human)
| Chr. | Chromosome 7 (human) |
| Band | 7p21.1 | Start | 16,753,755 bp |
| Band | 7p21.1 | End | 16,784,536 bp |

Gene location (Mouse)
| Chr. | Chromosome 12 (mouse) |
| Band | 12|12 A3 | Start | 36,064,556 bp |
| Band | 12|12 A3 | End | 36,092,499 bp |
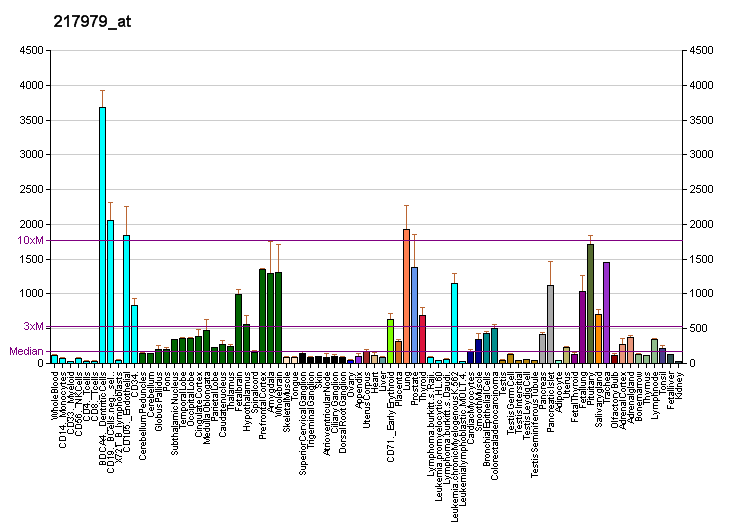
RNA expression pattern
| Bgee | Human / Mouse (ortholog); Top expressed in: parotid gland; visceral pleura; jejunal mucosa; endothelial cell; mucosa of sigmoid colon; Brodmann area 23; lower lobe of lung; germinal epithelium; bronchial epithelial cell; middle temporal gyrus / Top expressed in: habenula; lacrimal gland; subiculum; utricle; transitional epithelium of urinary bladder; crypt of lieberkuhn of small intestine; salivary gland; parotid gland; olfactory tubercle; right lung; More reference expression data |
| BioGPS | More reference expression data |
Gene ontology
| Molecular function | calcium channel regulator activity |
| Cellular component | integral component of membrane; plasma membrane; integral component of plasma membrane; membrane |
| Biological process | cell surface receptor signaling pathway; regulation of calcium ion transmembrane transport |
Sources:Amigo / QuickGO
Orthologs
| Databases | NCBI: entry; OMA: entry |
| Species | Human | Mouse |
| Entrez | 27075 | 66109 |
| Ensembl | ENSG00000106537 | ENSMUSG00000020577 |
| UniProt | O95857 | Q9D8C2 |
| RefSeq (mRNA) | NM_014399 | NM_025359 |
| RefSeq (protein) | NP_055214 | NP_079635 |
| Location (UCSC) | Chr 7: 16.75 – 16.78 Mb | Chr 12: 36.06 – 36.09 Mb |
| PubMed search |
- Wikidata
| View/Edit Human | View/Edit Mouse |

Tetraspanin-13 is a protein that in humans is encoded by the TSPAN13 gene.

The protein encoded by this gene is a member of the transmembrane 4 superfamily, also known as the tetraspanin family. Most of these members are cell-surface proteins that are characterized by the presence of four hydrophobic domains. The proteins mediate signal transduction events that play a role in the regulation of cell development, activation, growth and motility.
