= Circulating free DNA =

Degraded DNA fragments circulating in bodily fluids

Circulating free DNA (cfDNA) (also known as cell-free DNA) are degraded DNA fragments released to body fluids such as blood plasma, urine, cerebrospinal fluid, etc. Typical sizes of cfDNA fragments reflect chromatosome particles (~165bp), as well as multiples of nucleosomes, which protect DNA from digestion by apoptotic nucleases. The term cfDNA can be used to describe various forms of DNA freely circulating in body fluids, including circulating tumor DNA (ctDNA), cell-free mitochondrial DNA (ccf mtDNA), cell-free fetal DNA (cffDNA) and donor-derived cell-free DNA (dd-cfDNA).

Elevated levels of cfDNA are observed in some cancer, especially in advanced disease. There is evidence that cfDNA becomes increasingly frequent in circulation with the onset of age. cfDNA has been shown to be a useful biomarker for a multitude of ailments other than cancer and fetal medicine. This includes but is not limited to trauma, sepsis, aseptic inflammation, myocardial infarction, stroke, transplantation, diabetes, and sickle cell disease. cfDNA is mostly a double-stranded extracellular molecule of DNA, consisting of small fragments (50 to 200 bp) and larger fragments (21 kb) and has been recognized as an accurate marker for the diagnosis of prostate cancer and breast cancer.

Recent studies have demonstrated that cell-free DNA (cfDNA) fragmentation patterns reflect the chromatin organisation and transcriptional activity of their cells of origin, enabling the non-invasive inference of gene expression from plasma DNA. The first evidence for this came from analyses of nucleosome positioning around transcription start sites, which showed that gene expression programmes and active transcriptional states could be inferred from whole-genome sequencing of plasma DNA. Subsequent studies demonstrated that cfDNA fragmentation patterns reflect nucleosome positioning and chromatin accessibility across the genome, providing insights into the epigenetic and transcriptional landscapes of tissues and tumours contributing DNA to the circulation. Among these advances, EPIC-seq improved the inference of expression levels for individual genes from cfDNA fragmentation profiles and enabled applications in disease characterisation, tumour classification, and treatment monitoring..

Other publications confirm the origin of cfDNA from carcinomas and cfDNA occurs in patients with advanced cancer. Cell‐free DNA (cfDNA) is present in the circulating plasma and in other body fluids.

The release of cfDNA into the bloodstream appears by different reasons, including apoptosis, necrosis and NETosis. Its rapidly increased accumulation in blood during tumor development is caused by an excessive DNA release by apoptotic cells and necrotic cells. Active secretion within exosomes has been discussed, but it is still unknown whether this is a relevant or relatively minor source of cfDNA.

cfDNA circulates predominantly as nucleosomes, which are nuclear complexes of histones and DNA. cfDNA can also be observed in shorter size ranges (e.g. 50bp) and associated with regulatory elements. They are frequently nonspecifically elevated in cancer but may be more specific for monitoring cytotoxic cancer therapy, mainly for the early estimation of therapy efficacy.

== History ==
Circulating nucleic acids were first discovered by Mandel and Metais in 1948. It was later discovered that the level of cfDNA is significantly increased in the plasma of diseased patients. This discovery was first made in lupus patients and later it was determined that the levels of cfDNA are elevated in over half of cancer patients. Molecular analysis of cfDNA resulted in an important discovery that blood plasma DNA from cancer patients contains tumor-associated mutations and it can be used for cancer diagnostics and follow up. The ability to extract circulating tumor DNA (ctDNA) from the human plasma has led to huge advancements in noninvasive cancer detection. Most notably, it has led to what is now known as liquid biopsy. In short, liquid biopsy is using biomarkers and cancer cells in the blood as a means of diagnosing cancer type and stage. This type of biopsy is noninvasive and allows for the routine clinical screening that is important in determining cancer relapse after initial treatment.

== Different origins of cfDNA ==
The intracellular origin of cfDNA, e.g., either from nucleus or mitochondria, can also influence the inflammatory potential of cfDNA. mtDNA is a potent inflammatory trigger. mtDNA, due to its prokaryotic origin, holds many features that are similar to bacterial DNA, including the presence of a relatively high content of unmethylated CpG motifs, which are rarely observed in nuclear DNA. The unmethylated CpG motifs are of particular importance as TLR9, the only endolysosomal DNA-sensing receptor, has a unique specificity for unmethylated CpG DNA. mtDNA was shown to activate neutrophils through TLR9 engagement unless coupled to carrier proteins, mtDNA, but not nuclear DNA, can be recognized as a danger-associated molecular pattern inducing pro-inflammation through TLR9. Collins et al. reported that intra-articular injection of mtDNA induces arthritis in vivo, proposing a direct role of mtDNA extrusion in the disease pathogenesis of rheumatoid arthritis and autoimmune rheumatic diseases.

MtDNA, in contrast to nuclear DNA, is characterized by elevated basal levels of 8-OHdG, a marker of oxidative damage. The high content of oxidative damage in mtDNA is attributed to the close proximity of mtDNA to Reactive oxygen species (ROS) and relatively inefficient DNA repair mechanisms that can lead to the accumulation of DNA lesions.

They have shown that oxidative burst during NETosis can oxidize mtDNA and the released oxidized mtDNA by itself, or in complex with TFAM, can generate prominent induction of type I IFNs. Oxidized mtDNA generated during programmed cell death is not limited to activate TLR9, but was shown to also engage the NLRP3 inflammasome, leading to the production of pro-inflammatory cytokines, IL-1β, and IL-18. MtDNA can also be recognized by cyclic GMP-AMP synthase (cGAS), a cytosolic dsDNA sensor to initiate a STING-IRF3-dependent pathway that in turn orchestrates the production of type I IFNs.

== Methods ==
=== Collection and purification ===
cfDNA purification is prone to contamination through genomic DNA due to ruptured blood cells during the purification process. Because of this, different purification methods can lead to significantly different cfDNA extraction yields. At the moment, typical purification methods involve collection of blood via venipuncture, centrifugation to pellet the cells, and extraction of cfDNA from the plasma. The specific method for extraction of cfDNA from the plasma depends on the protocol desired.

=== Analysis of cfDNA ===
==== Polymerase chain reaction ====
In general, the detection of specific DNA sequences in cfDNA can be done by two means; sequence specific detection (using polymerase chain reaction, commonly called PCR) and general genomic analysis of all cfDNA present in the blood (DNA sequencing). The presence of cfDNA containing DNA from tumor cells was originally characterized using PCR amplification of mutated genes from extracted cfDNA. PCR based analysis of cfDNA typically rely on the analytical nature of qPCR and digital PCR. Both of these techniques can be sensitive and cost-effective for detecting limited number of hotspots mutations. For this reason the PCR based method of detection is still very prominent tool in cfDNA detection. This method has the limitation of not being able to detect larger structural variant present in ctDNA and for this reason massively parallel next generation sequencing is also used to determine ctDNA content in cfDNA

==== Massively parallel sequencing ====
Massively parallel sequencing (MPS) has allowed the deep sequencing of cfDNA. This deep sequencing is required to detect mutant circulating tumor DNA (ctDNA) present in low concentrations in the plasma. Two main sequencing techniques are typically used for targeted analysis of mutant cfDNA; PCR amplicon sequencing and hybrid capture sequencing. Other forms of genetic alterations can be analysed using ctDNA (e.g. somatic copy number alterations or genetic rearrangements). Here, methods based on untargeted sequencing, like WGS or low coverage WGS, are mainly used. Numerous epigenetic features of the tissue of origin may be extracted from cfDNA WGS, i.e. nucleosome spacing and DNA methylation state.

== cfDNA and illness ==
=== Cancer ===
The majority of cfDNA research is focused on DNA originating from cancer (ctDNA). In short, the DNA from cancer cells gets released by cell-death, secretion or other mechanisms still not known. The fraction of cfDNA released by tumor cells in circulation is influenced by the size of the tumor as well as the tumor stage and type. Early stage cancers and brain tumor are among the most difficult to detect with liquid biopsy.

=== Trauma ===
Elevated cfDNA has been detected with acute blunt trauma and burn victims. In both of these cases cfDNA concentration in the plasma were correlated to the severity of the injury, as well as outcome of the patient.

=== Sepsis ===
It has been shown that an increase cfDNA in the plasma of ICU patients is an indicator of the onset of sepsis. Due to the severity of sepsis in ICU patients, further testing in order to determine the scope of cfDNA efficacy as a biomarker for septic risk is likely.

=== Myocardial infarction ===
Patients showing signs of myocardial infarction have been shown to have elevated cfDNA levels. This elevation correlates to patient outcome in terms of additional cardiac issues and even mortality within two years.

=== Transplant graft rejection ===
Foreign cfDNA has been shown to be present in the plasma of solid organ transplant patients. This cfDNA is derived from the grafted organ and is termed dd-cfDNA (donor-derived cell-free DNA). Dd-cfDNA values spike initially after a transplant procedure (>5%) with values heavily depending on the transplanted organ and typically drop (<0.5%) within one week for most organs. If the host body rejects the grafted organ the ddcfDNA concentration in the blood (plasma) will rise to a level greater than 5-fold higher than those without complications. This increase in ddcfDNA can be detected prior to any other clinical or biochemical signs of complication. Besides dd-cfDNA in plasma, some research also focused on the excretion of ddcfDNA through urine. This is of special interest in kidney allografts transplantation. When dd-cfDNA is measured using targeted next-generation sequencing, assays were used with a population specific genome wide SNP panel. Attaching barcodes to the ligated adapters prior to NGS during library preparation make absolute ddcfDNA quantification possible without the need for prior donor genotyping. This has been shown to provide additional clinical benefits if the absolute number of cfDNA copies is considered combined with the fraction of ddcfDNA over cfDNA from the recipient to determine whether the allograft is being rejected or not.

== Future directions ==
cfDNA sampling allows a rapid, easy, non-invasive and repetitive method of sampling. A combination of these biological features, and technical feasibility of sampling, position cfDNA as a potential biomarker of enormous utility--for example for autoimmune rheumatic diseases and tumors. cfDNA could also be a potential biomarker, with its own advantages over invasive tissue biopsy, as a quantitative measure for detection of transplant rejection as well as immunosuppression optimisation. However, this method lacks uniformity on the type of sample (plasma/serum/synovial fluid/urine), methods of sample collection/processing, free or cell-surface bound DNA, cfDNA extraction and cfDNA quantification, and also in the presentation and interpretation of quantitative cfDNA findings.

cfDNA is quantified by fluorescence methods, such as PicoGreen staining and ultraviolet spectrometry, the more sensitive is quantitative polymerase chain reaction (PCR; SYBR Green or TaqMan) of repetitive elements or housekeeping genes, or deep sequencing methods. Circulating nucleosomes, the primary repeating unit of DNA organization in chromatin, are quantified by enzyme-linked immunosorbent assays (ELISA).

== Databases ==
- NucPosDB: a database of nucleosome positioning in vivo and nucleosomics of cell-free DNA
