= Clofibride =

Chemical compound

Clinical data
- ATC code: C10AB10 (WHO)

Pharmacokinetic data
- Metabolism: Hydrolyzed to clofibric acid; hepatic glucuronidation
- Elimination half-life: 12 hours (clofibric acid)
- Excretion: Renal (mostly) and fecal

Identifiers
- IUPAC name: 3-(dimethylcarbamoyl)propyl 2-(4-chlorophenoxy)-2-methylpropanoate
- CAS Number: 26717-47-5
- PubChem CID: 160134
- ChemSpider: 140758
- UNII: 0S9SLS3L93
- KEGG: D07188
- ChEMBL: ChEMBL1697831
- CompTox Dashboard (EPA): DTXSID1022841
- ECHA InfoCard: 100.043.542

Chemical and physical data
- Formula: C_{16}H_{22}ClNO_{4}
- Molar mass: 327.81 g·mol^{−1}
- 3D model (JSmol): Interactive image
- SMILES: Clc1ccc(OC(C(=O)OCCCC(=O)N(C)C)(C)C)cc1
- InChI: InChI=1S/C16H22ClNO4/c1-16(2,22-13-9-7-12(17)8-10-13)15(20)21-11-5-6-14(19)18(3)4/h7-10H,5-6,11H2,1-4H3; Key:CXQGFLBVUNUQIA-UHFFFAOYSA-N

Clofibride is a fibrate. Clofibride is a derivative of clofibrate. In the body it is converted into 4-chlorophenoxyisobutyric acid (clofibric acid), which is the true hypolipidemic agent. So clofibride, just like clofibrate is a prodrug of clofibric acid.
