= Fenofibrate/pravastatin =

Combination medication

Combination of
- Fenofibrate: Peroxisome proliferator-activated receptor (PPAR) agonist
- Pravastatin: Statin

Clinical data
- Trade names: Pravafenix
- AHFS/Drugs.com: UK Drug Information
- Routes of administration: By mouth
- ATC code: C10BA03 (WHO)

Legal status
- Legal status: UK: POM (Prescription only); EU: Rx-only; In general: ℞ (Prescription only)

Identifiers
- KEGG: D10855

Fenofibrate/pravastatin, sold under the brand name Pravafenix, is a combination medication used for the treatment of hypercholesterolemia (high blood cholesterol levels) in adults whose low-density lipoprotein (LDL) cholesterol is already being controlled with pravastatin alone but who still need to improve their cholesterol levels and to reduce their levels of triglycerides. It contains fenofibrate and pravastatin. It is taken by mouth.

The most common side effects are abdominal distension (bloating), abdominal pain (stomach ache), constipation, diarrhea, dry mouth, dyspepsia (heartburn), eructation (belching), flatulence (gas), nausea (feeling sick), abdominal discomfort, vomiting and raised blood levels of liver enzymes.

Fenofibrate is a peroxisome proliferator-activated receptor (PPAR) agonist. It activates a type of receptor called the peroxisome proliferator-activated receptor alpha, which is involved in breaking down fat from the diet, especially triglycerides. When the receptors are activated, the breakdown of fats is accelerated, and this helps clear the blood of cholesterol and triglycerides.

Pravastatin belongs to the group called statins. It reduces total blood cholesterol by blocking the action of 3-hydroxy-3-methyl-glutaryl-coenzyme-A (HMG-CoA) reductase, an enzyme in the liver involved in the production of cholesterol. As the liver needs cholesterol to produce bile, the reduced blood cholesterol level causes the liver cells to produce receptors that draw cholesterol from the blood, reducing its level even further. The cholesterol drawn out of the blood in this way is the LDL cholesterol.

== Medical uses ==
Fenofibrate/pravastatin is indicated for the treatment of high-coronary-heart-disease (CHD)-risk adults with mixed dyslipidemia characterized by high triglycerides and low HDL-cholesterol (C) levels whose LDL-C levels are adequately controlled while on a treatment with pravastatin 40 mg monotherapy.

== Society and culture ==
=== Legal status ===
In January 2011, the Committee for Medicinal Products for Human Use of the European Medicines Agency adopted a positive opinion, recommending the granting of a marketing authorization for the medicinal product Pravafenix, fenofibrate/pravastatin, 160 mg/40 mg, hard capsule, intended the treatment of high coronary heart disease (CHD)-risk adult patients with mixed dyslipidemia characterized by high triglycerides and low HDL-cholesterol levels whose LDL-C levels are adequately controlled while on a treatment with pravastatin 40 mg monotherapy. The applicant for this medicinal product is Laboratoires S.M.B. S.A. Fenofibrate/pravastatin was approved for use in the European Union in April 2011.
