= Ronifibrate =

Chemical compound

Clinical data
- Other names: 3-[(pyridin-3-yl)carbonyloxy]propyl 2-(4-chlorophenoxy)-2-methylpropanoate
- ATC code: C10AB07 (WHO)

Identifiers
- IUPAC name: 3-{[2-(4-chlorophenoxy)-2-methylpropanoyl]oxy}propyl nicotinate
- CAS Number: 42597-57-9
- PubChem CID: 68671
- ChemSpider: 61925
- UNII: W86I18X716
- ChEMBL: ChEMBL153983
- CompTox Dashboard (EPA): DTXSID80195362

Chemical and physical data
- Formula: C_{19}H_{20}ClNO_{5}
- Molar mass: 377.82 g·mol^{−1}
- 3D model (JSmol): Interactive image
- SMILES: O=C(OCCCOC(=O)C(Oc1ccc(Cl)cc1)(C)C)c2cccnc2
- InChI: InChI=1S/C19H20ClNO5/c1-19(2,26-16-8-6-15(20)7-9-16)18(23)25-12-4-11-24-17(22)14-5-3-10-21-13-14/h3,5-10,13H,4,11-12H2,1-2H3; Key:AYJVGKWCGIYEAK-UHFFFAOYSA-N

Ronifibrate is a fibrate, a hypolipidemic agent. It is a combined ester of clofibric acid and niacin (nicotinic acid) with 1,3-propanediol. In the body, the ester is split to 1,3-propanediol and both acids which work in the same way, lowering lipids in blood.
