= Fenofibrate/simvastatin =

Combination drug

Combination of
- Fenofibrate: Fibrate
- Simvastatin: Statin

Clinical data
- Trade names: Cholib
- Routes of administration: By mouth
- ATC code: C10BA04 (WHO)

Legal status
- Legal status: EU: Rx-only

Identifiers
- CAS Number: 2447635-10-9
- KEGG: D10857

Fenofibrate/simvastatin, sold under the brand name Cholib, is a fixed-dose combination medication used to treat abnormal blood lipid levels when used in combination with a low-fat diet and exercise. It contains fenofibrate and simvastatin.

It was approved for use in the European Union in August 2013.

== Medical uses ==
Fenofibrate/simvastatin is indicated as adjunctive therapy to diet and exercise in high cardiovascular risk adults with mixed dyslipidemia to reduce triglycerides and increase HDL C levels when LDL C levels are adequately controlled with the corresponding dose of simvastatin monotherapy.
