= Simfibrate =

Chemical compound

Clinical data
- Trade names: Cholesolvin
- Other names: 3-{[2-(4-Chlorophenoxy)-2-methylpropanoyl]oxy}propyl 2-(4-chlorophenoxy)-2-methylpropanoate
- ATC code: C10AB06 (WHO)

Identifiers
- IUPAC name: Propane-1,3-diyl bis[2-(4-chlorophenoxy)-2-methylpropanoate]
- CAS Number: 14929-11-4
- PubChem CID: 5217
- ChemSpider: 5028
- UNII: L2R75RQX26
- KEGG: D01212
- CompTox Dashboard (EPA): DTXSID8057647
- ECHA InfoCard: 100.035.438

Chemical and physical data
- Formula: C_{23}H_{26}Cl_{2}O_{6}
- Molar mass: 469.36 g·mol^{−1}
- 3D model (JSmol): Interactive image
- SMILES: Clc2ccc(OC(C(=O)OCCCOC(=O)C(Oc1ccc(Cl)cc1)(C)C)(C)C)cc2
- InChI: InChI=1S/C23H26Cl2O6/c1-22(2,30-18-10-6-16(24)7-11-18)20(26)28-14-5-15-29-21(27)23(3,4)31-19-12-8-17(25)9-13-19/h6-13H,5,14-15H2,1-4H3; Key:JLRNKCZRCMIVKA-UHFFFAOYSA-N

Simfibrate (JAN/INN; trade name Cholesolvin) is a fibrate that has been used for the treatment of hyperlipidemia. The substance is a double ester of clofibric acid with 1,3-propanediol which is cleaved in the body to one molecule of 1,3-propanediol and two molecules of clofibric acid which is the true lipid-lowering agent.
