= C15H11I4NO4 =

The molecular formula C_{15}H_{11}I_{4}NO_{4} may refer to:

- Dextrothyroxine
- Levothyroxine, or L-thyroxine
- Thyroxine (or T_{4})
