= AURORA trial =

Study investigating the use of rosuvastatin

The AURORA trial (A Study to Evaluate the Use of Rosuvastatin in Subjects on Regular Hemodialysis: An Assessment of Survival and Cardiovascular Events) was a randomized, double-blind, placebo-controlled study investigating the use of rosuvastatin in the prevention of cardiovascular disease among patients undergoing chronic hemodialysis.

The trial was undertaken because although patients with end-stage renal disease (ESRD) are at high risk of adverse cardiovascular events, no large clinical trial had confirmed the benefit of lipid-lowering agents. The AURORA trial sought to fill this gap.

The trial was conducted across 280 medical centers in 25 countries. The study randomized 2,776 patients, aged 50–80 years and undergoing maintenance hemodialysis, to one of two groups. One group received rosuvastatin 10 mg daily and the other group received a placebo. The combined primary end point was death from cardiovascular causes, nonfatal myocardial infarction, or nonfatal stroke. Although the mean LDL cholesterol was reduced by 43% in the rosuvastatin arm of the study at three months, no difference in the primary end point was demonstrated at an average follow-up of 3.8 years.

The trial was sponsored, in part, by AstraZeneca, the marketer of Crestor.
