= Magnesium pyridoxal 5-phosphate glutamate =

Chemical compound

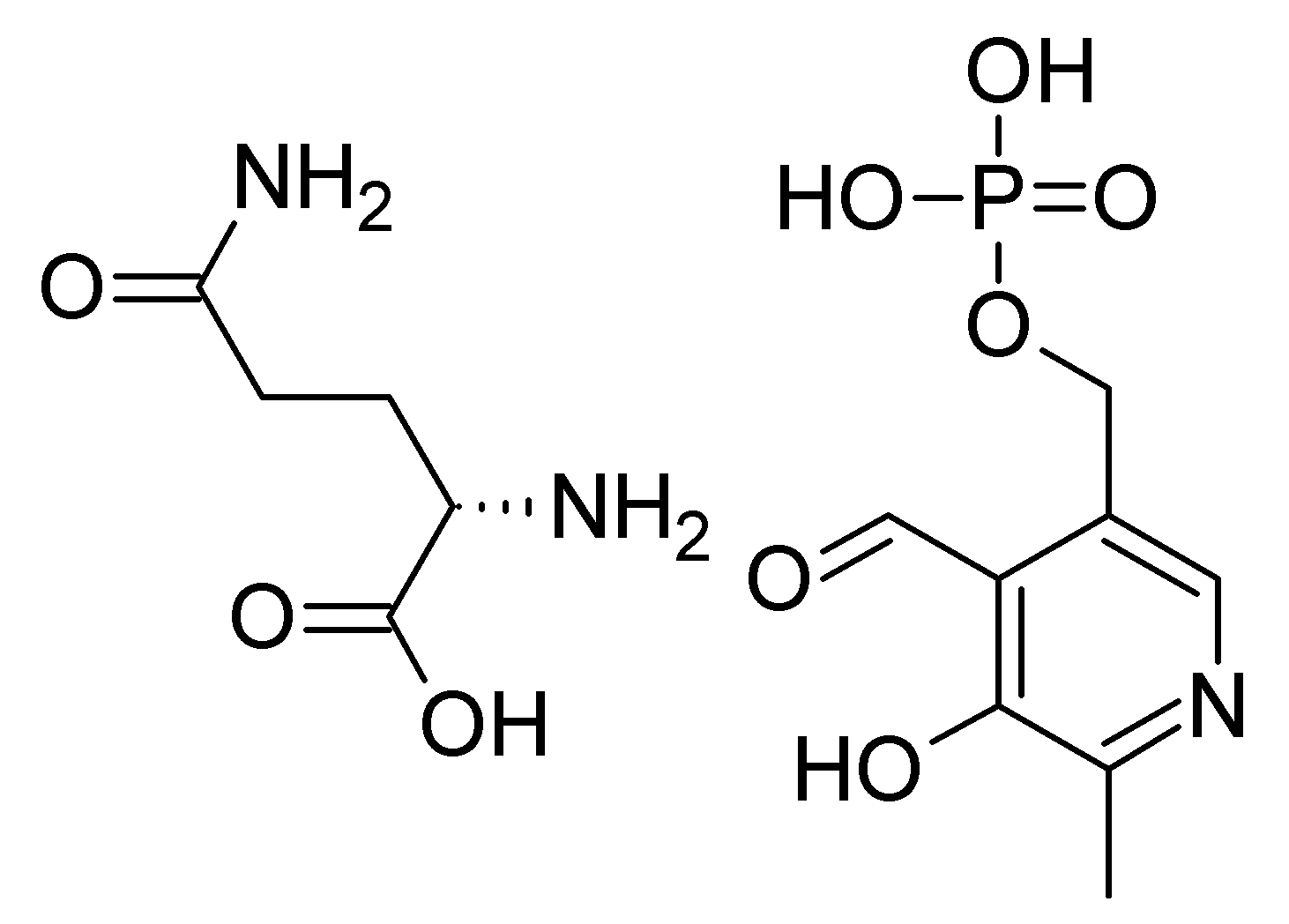

Clinical data
- Trade names: Sedalipid
- ATC code: C10AX07 (WHO)

Identifiers
- IUPAC name: (2S)-2,5-diamino-5-oxopentanoic acid; (4-formyl-5-hydroxy-6-methylpyridin-3-yl)methyl dihydrogen phosphate
- CAS Number: 62055-05-4 (magnesium salt)
- PubChem CID: 173846
- ChemSpider: 151728
- CompTox Dashboard (EPA): DTXSID00977622

Chemical and physical data
- Formula: C_{13}H_{20}N_{3}O_{9}P
- Molar mass: 393.289 g·mol^{−1}
- 3D model (JSmol): Interactive image
- SMILES: O=C(N)CC[C@H](N)C(=O)O.O=P(O)(O)OCc1cnc(c(O)c1C=O)C
- InChI: InChI=1S/C8H10NO6P.C5H10N2O3/c1-5-8(11)7(3-10)6(2-9-5)4-15-16(12,13)14;6-3(5(9)10)1-2-4(7)8/h2-3,11H,4H2,1H3,(H2,12,13,14);3H,1-2,6H2,(H2,7,8)(H,9,10)/t;3-/m.0/s1; Key:BCARVEADLDZBJT-HVDRVSQOSA-N

Magnesium pyridoxal 5-phosphate glutamate (trade name Sedalipid) is a hypolipidemic agent.
