= Nicofuranose =

Chemical compound

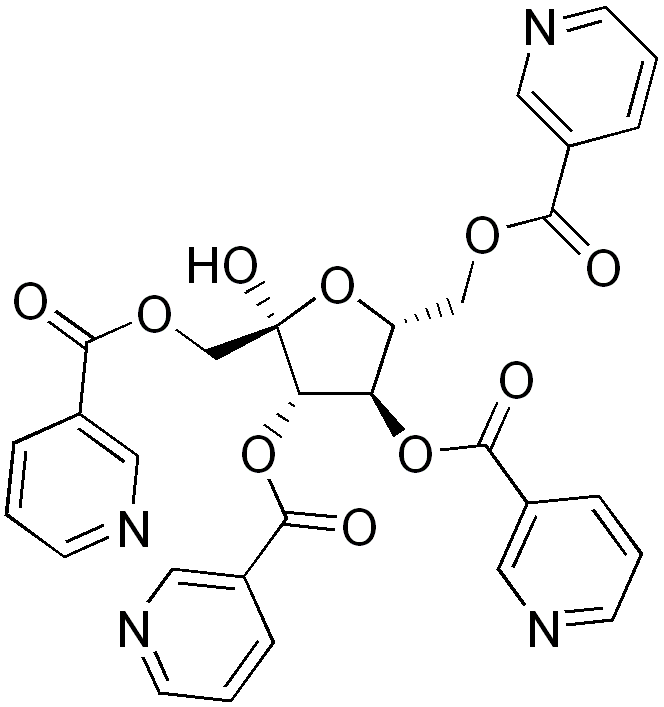

Clinical data
- ATC code: C10AD03 (WHO)

Identifiers
- IUPAC name: 1,3,4,6-tetrakis-O-(pyridin-3-ylcarbonyl)-β-D-fructofuranose
- CAS Number: 15351-13-0
- PubChem CID: 25495
- ChemSpider: 23791
- UNII: GF99P6327K
- KEGG: D07189
- CompTox Dashboard (EPA): DTXSID6023365
- ECHA InfoCard: 100.035.789

Chemical and physical data
- Formula: C_{30}H_{24}N_{4}O_{10}
- Molar mass: 600.540 g·mol^{−1}
- 3D model (JSmol): Interactive image
- SMILES: C1=CC(=CN=C1)C(=O)OC[C@@H]2[C@H]([C@@H]([C@](O2)(COC(=O)C3=CN=CC=C3)O)OC(=O)C4=CN=CC=C4)OC(=O)C5=CN=CC=C5
- InChI: InChI=1S/C30H24N4O10/c35-26(19-5-1-9-31-13-19)40-17-23-24(42-28(37)21-7-3-11-33-15-21)25(43-29(38)22-8-4-12-34-16-22)30(39,44-23)18-41-27(36)20-6-2-10-32-14-20/h1-16,23-25,39H,17-18H2/t23-,24-,25+,30-/m1/s1; Key:FUWFSXZKBMCSKF-ZASNTINBSA-N

Nicofuranose is a niacin derivative used as a hypolipidemic agent.
