= Farglitazar =

Chemical compound

Clinical data
- Pregnancy category: N/A
- ATC code: none

Legal status
- Legal status: Development discontinued

Identifiers
- IUPAC name: N-(o-Benzoylphenyl)-O-[2-(5-methyl- 2-phenyl-4-oxazolyl)ethyl]-L-tyrosine
- CAS Number: 196808-45-4
- PubChem CID: 170364
- IUPHAR/BPS: 2672
- ChemSpider: 148961
- UNII: 3433GY7132
- KEGG: D04132
- ChEMBL: ChEMBL107367
- CompTox Dashboard (EPA): DTXSID1047310

Chemical and physical data
- Formula: C_{34}H_{30}N_{2}O_{5}
- Molar mass: 546.623 g·mol^{−1}
- 3D model (JSmol): Interactive image
- SMILES: O=C(c1ccccc1)c2ccccc2N[C@H](C(=O)O)Cc5ccc(OCCc3nc(oc3C)c4ccccc4)cc5
- InChI: InChI=1S/C34H30N2O5/c1-23-29(36-33(41-23)26-12-6-3-7-13-26)20-21-40-27-18-16-24(17-19-27)22-31(34(38)39)35-30-15-9-8-14-28(30)32(37)25-10-4-2-5-11-25/h2-19,31,35H,20-22H2,1H3,(H,38,39)/t31-/m0/s1; Key:ZZCHHVUQYRMYLW-HKBQPEDESA-N

Farglitazar is a peroxisome proliferator-activated receptor agonist which was formerly under development by GlaxoSmithKline, but has never been marketed. It progressed to phase II clinical trials for the treatment of hepatic fibrosis, but failed to show efficacy. After reaching phase III for type 2 diabetes, further development was discontinued.
