= Etofibrate =

Chemical compound

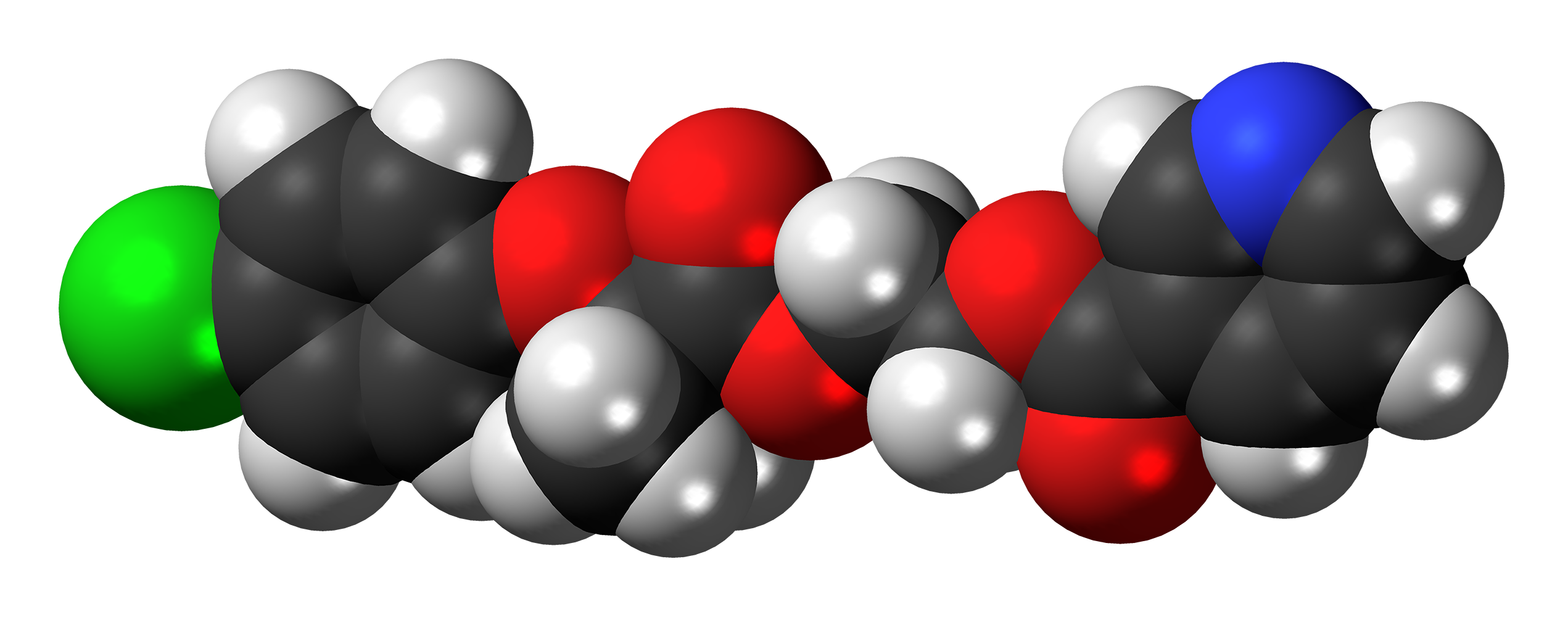

Clinical data
- AHFS/Drugs.com: International Drug Names
- ATC code: C10AB09 (WHO)

Pharmacokinetic data
- Metabolism: Hydrolyzed to clofibric acid and niacin

Identifiers
- IUPAC name: 2-[(pyridin-3-yl)carbonyloxy]ethyl 2-(4-chlorophenoxy)-2-methylpropanoate
- CAS Number: 31637-97-5
- PubChem CID: 65777
- DrugBank: DB08983
- ChemSpider: 59197
- UNII: 23TF67G79M
- KEGG: D07187
- ChEMBL: ChEMBL358150
- CompTox Dashboard (EPA): DTXSID80185521
- ECHA InfoCard: 100.046.115

Chemical and physical data
- Formula: C_{18}H_{18}ClNO_{5}
- Molar mass: 363.79 g·mol^{−1}
- 3D model (JSmol): Interactive image
- SMILES: O=C(OCCOC(=O)C(Oc1ccc(Cl)cc1)(C)C)c2cccnc2
- InChI: InChI=1S/C18H18ClNO5/c1-18(2,25-15-7-5-14(19)6-8-15)17(22)24-11-10-23-16(21)13-4-3-9-20-12-13/h3-9,12H,10-11H2,1-2H3; Key:XXRVYAFBUDSLJX-UHFFFAOYSA-N

Etofibrate is a fibrate. It is a combination of clofibrate and niacin, linked together by an ester bond. In the body, clofibrate and niacin separate and are released gradually, in a manner similar to controlled-release formulations.
