= BPZ =

BPZ may refer to:

- ISO 639:bpz, the ISO 639-3 code for the Bilba language
- Belarusian Green Party (Belarusian: Беларуская партыя «Зялёныя»; БПЗ), an eco-socialist Green party in Belarus
- Bisphenol Z
