= Policosanol =

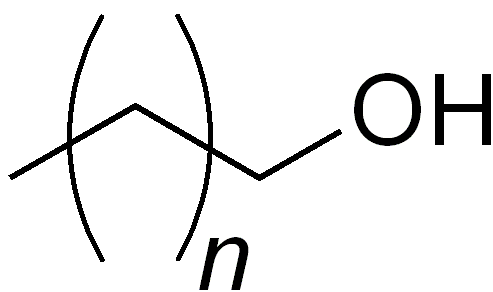

Clinical data
- AHFS/Drugs.com: International Drug Names
- ATC code: C10AX08 (WHO)

Identifiers
- IUPAC name: Octacosanol, triacontanol, etc.
- CAS Number: 142583-61-7
- ChemSpider: none
- CompTox Dashboard (EPA): DTXSID5021172

Chemical and physical data
- Formula: CH_{3}-(CH_{2})_{n}-CH_{2}OH n=24-34
- Molar mass: (variable)

Policosanol is the generic term for a mixture of long chain alcohols extracted from plant waxes. It is used as a dietary supplement.

== History ==
Policosanol was originally derived from sugar cane but the chemicals can also be isolated from beeswax, cereal grains, grasses, leaves, fruits, nuts, and seeds of many foods. Plant waxes consist of long chain alkanes and their derivatives, including long chain fatty acids and alcohols. Policosanols are very long chain alcohols with carbon backbones ranging from 24 to 34 carbons.

The first policosanol supplements were produced by Dalmer Laboratories in Cuba; studies conducted and published by that group have found that policosanol is safe and effective as a lipid-lowering agent. However these studies were small, and efforts by groups outside of Cuba have failed to replicate these results.

== Safety and efficacy ==
A meta-analysis in 2005 concluded that human policosanol consumption is safe and well tolerated and is effective at lowering the blood cholesterol. As of 2010, they were marketed as lipid-lowering agents in the Caribbean, Central and South America, and Canada. Furthermore, another meta-analysis published in 2018 with 22 studies and 1886 subjects showed policosanol could improve dyslipidemia with raising HDL. The blood pressure lowering effect of Cuban policosanol has been shown in an animal model using spontaneously hypertensive rats (SHR) and a human trial.
