= Tiadenol =

Chemical compound

Clinical data
- Other names: 2-({10-[(2-hydroxyethyl)sulfanyl]decyl}sulfanyl)ethan-1-ol
- AHFS/Drugs.com: International Drug Names
- ATC code: C10AX03 (WHO)

Identifiers
- IUPAC name: 2,2'-[decane-1,10-diylbis(thio)]diethanol
- CAS Number: 6964-20-1
- PubChem CID: 23403
- ChemSpider: 21885
- UNII: 22251270CX
- KEGG: D07191
- CompTox Dashboard (EPA): DTXSID50219903
- ECHA InfoCard: 100.027.423

Chemical and physical data
- Formula: C_{14}H_{30}O_{2}S_{2}
- Molar mass: 294.51 g·mol^{−1}
- 3D model (JSmol): Interactive image
- SMILES: OCCSCCCCCCCCCCSCCO
- InChI: InChI=1S/C14H30O2S2/c15-9-13-17-11-7-5-3-1-2-4-6-8-12-18-14-10-16/h15-16H,1-14H2; Key:WRCITXQNXAIKLR-UHFFFAOYSA-N

Tiadenol is a hypolipidemic agent.
