= Aluminium clofibrate =

Chemical compound

Clinical data
- MedlinePlus: a699047
- ATC code: C10AB03 (WHO)

Pharmacokinetic data
- Metabolism: Hydrolyzed to clofibric acid and aluminium hydroxide
- Excretion: Renal

Identifiers
- IUPAC name: Aluminium bis(2-(4-chlorophenoxy)-2-methylpropanoate) hydroxide
- CAS Number: 24818-79-9
- PubChem CID: 6328223
- ChemSpider: 11644433
- UNII: 56203T2K2X
- KEGG: D01208
- CompTox Dashboard (EPA): DTXSID70905093
- ECHA InfoCard: 100.042.237

Chemical and physical data
- Formula: C_{20}H_{24}Cl_{2}O_{7}
- Molar mass: 447.31 g·mol^{−1}
- 3D model (JSmol): Interactive image
- SMILES: Clc2ccc(OC(C)(C)C(=O)O[Al](O)OC(=O)C(C)(C)Oc1ccc(Cl)cc1)cc2
- InChI: InChI=1S/2C10H11ClO3.Al.H2O/c2*1-10(2,9(12)13)14-8-5-3-7(11)4-6-8;;/h2*3-6H,1-2H3,(H,12,13);;1H2/q;;+3;/p-3; Key:USWVMPGQVYZHCA-UHFFFAOYSA-K

Aluminium clofibrate (or alfibrate) is a fibrate.

== See also ==
- Clofibrate
