= Aluminium nicotinate =

Chemical compound

Clinical data
- MedlinePlus: a603033
- Routes of administration: Oral
- ATC code: C10AD04 (WHO)

Identifiers
- IUPAC name: aluminium tris(pyridine-3-carboxylate)
- CAS Number: 1976-28-9
- PubChem CID: 16098
- ChemSpider: 19954489
- UNII: BDI80PUH9N
- CompTox Dashboard (EPA): DTXSID60173441
- ECHA InfoCard: 100.016.212

Chemical and physical data
- Formula: C_{18}H_{12}AlN_{3}O_{6}
- Molar mass: 393.291 g·mol^{−1}
- 3D model (JSmol): Interactive image
- SMILES: [Al+3].OC(=O)c1cccnc1
- InChI: InChI=1S/C6H5NO2.Al/c8-6(9)5-2-1-3-7-4-5;/h1-4H,(H,8,9);/q;+3; Key:RIROQZQPXBZPCI-UHFFFAOYSA-N

Aluminium nicotinate is a niacin derivative used as a hypolipidemic agent.
