= C20H22O3 =

The molecular formula C_{20}H_{22}O_{3} (molar mass: 310.39 g/mol, exact mass: 310.1569 u) may refer to:

- Avobenzone
- Nafenopin
