= Probucol =

Chemical compound

Clinical data
- Pronunciation: /ˈproʊbjukɒl/ PROH-bew-kol
- Trade names: Lorelco
- Other names: 2,6-di-tert-butyl-4-({2-[(3,5-di-tert-butyl-4-hydroxyphenyl)sulfanyl]propan-2-yl}sulfanyl)phenol
- AHFS/Drugs.com: Micromedex Detailed Consumer Information
- MedlinePlus: a611037
- ATC code: C10AX02 (WHO)

Pharmacokinetic data
- Metabolism: minimally renal
- Elimination half-life: 50-62 h initial, 98 h steady-state
- Excretion: fecal (84%), urinary (1.9%)

Identifiers
- IUPAC name: 4,4'-[Propane-2,2-diylbis(thio)]bis(2,6-di-tert-butylphenol)
- CAS Number: 23288-49-5
- PubChem CID: 4912
- IUPHAR/BPS: 7277
- DrugBank: DB01599
- ChemSpider: 4743
- UNII: P3CTH044XJ
- KEGG: D00476
- ChEBI: CHEBI:8427
- ChEMBL: ChEMBL608
- CompTox Dashboard (EPA): DTXSID2045440
- ECHA InfoCard: 100.041.404

Chemical and physical data
- Formula: C_{31}H_{48}O_{2}S_{2}
- Molar mass: 516.84 g·mol^{−1}
- 3D model (JSmol): Interactive image
- Solubility in water: very soluble in tricholoromethane, soluble in ethanol, insoluble in water
- SMILES: S(c1cc(c(O)c(c1)C(C)(C)C)C(C)(C)C)C(Sc2cc(c(O)c(c2)C(C)(C)C)C(C)(C)C)(C)C
- InChI: InChI=1S/C31H48O2S2/c1-27(2,3)21-15-19(16-22(25(21)32)28(4,5)6)34-31(13,14)35-20-17-23(29(7,8)9)26(33)24(18-20)30(10,11)12/h15-18,32-33H,1-14H3; Key:FYPMFJGVHOHGLL-UHFFFAOYSA-N

Probucol, sold under the trade name Lorelco among others, is an lipid-lowering agent initially developed for the treatment of coronary artery disease. Clinical use was discontinued in some countries after it was found that the drug may have the undesired effect of lowering HDL-C in patients with a previous history of heart disease. It may also cause QT interval prolongation.

Probucol was originally developed as an industrial antioxidant added to tires to maximize their longevity.

== Medical uses ==
In Japan, it is approved for "hyperlipidemia (including familial hypercholesterolemia and xanthomas)". In China, it is approved for hypercholesterolemia.

== Adverse effects ==
During both clinical trials and postmarketing surveillance, most adverse effects were limited to the digestive system and the skin. Those included diarrhea, abdominal pain, nausea, loss of appetite, rash, and itching. For each of these effect, the incidence was between 0.1% and 1% ("uncommon"). QT prolongation was noted as rare (< 0.1%) in the package inserts. Elevated liver enzymes (ALT, AST, ALP, LDH), elevated BUN, reduction in red blood cells, white blood cells, and/or platelet count, elevated creatine kinase are also possible. The Chinese package insert states that ALT, AST, bilirubin, uric acid, and BUN elevations are transient.

Possible serious adverse effects include ventricular arrhythmia (Torsades de pointes), syncope, gastrointestinal bleeding, peripheral neuritis, and rhabdomyolysis. The frequency of these are unknown.

== Drug interactions ==
May reduce the blood concentration of cyclosporin (unknown mechanism). There exist reports of significantly declined HDL-C with clofibrate (unknown mechanism).

Risk of arrhythmia is elevated when used with other drugs that can cause arrhythmia, especially tricyclic antidepressants and phenothiazines. Potentiates the effect of diabetic medications and coumarin anticoagulants.

== Mechanism of action ==
Probucol lowers the level of cholesterol in the bloodstream by increasing the rate of LDL catabolism. Specifically, this happens by changing the structure of LDL, among other effects. The LDL receptor is not involved: it works in rabbits and humans without a working LDL receptor (homozygous familial hypercholesterolemia). It also enhances the excretion of cholesterol into bile. It is able to lower LDL-C by 10-20%.

It is also a powerful antioxidant. At a low dose (insufficient to affect LDL-C or HDL-C levels), it prevents the oxidation of cholestrol in LDLs. This might slow the formation of foam cells, which form atherosclerotic plaques. It partially does this by increasing PON1 activity, thus increasing the antioxidant properties of HDL.

Probucol also lowers HDL-C (HDL cholesterol, i.e. the amount of cholesterol found in HDLs) by about 30%. This has historically caused its discontinuation from several Western countries. This has several causes:

1. It inhibits ABCA1-dependent cholesterol transport (but not SR-BI–mediated efflux), which moves cholesterol from cells such as macrophages into HDL.
2. It increases CETP activity by lowering the amount of ANGPTL3. This also causes an increase in preβ1-HDL (lipid-poor particles) and a decrease in HDL phospholipids.
3. It increases HDL absorption by the liver via SR-BI.

Recall that one of the functions of HDL is reverse cholesterol transport (moving cholesterol from peripheral tissues into the liver). Inhibition of ABCA1 would be detrimental to the process, whereas enhancing CETP and SR-BI activities is beneficial for the transport function. Overall, probucol increases the capacity for reverse cholesterol transport, so the observed HDL-C reduction does not lead to a decrease in a patient's cholesterol-removing ability.

The adverse effect of QT prolongation is possibly due to inhibition of hERG trafficking.

== Pharmacokinetics ==
Oral absorption is limited and erratic. Food increases absorption. With a single oral dose of 250 mg, t_{max} is at 18 hours post-ingestion. If taken daily, 3 to 4 months are required to reach steady-state concentrations.

The tissue distribution of probucol has been studied in rats, dogs, and monkeys using a ^{14}C-labelled version of the drug. In rats, a single 100 mg/kg dose results in liver, adrenal glands, and brown fat concentrations at 3–10× plasma concentration and central nervous system, gonad, and eye concentrations at 1/7–1/20× plasma concentration. In rats, 21 days of continuous 100 mg/kg/d feeding results in accumulation in brown fat, adrenal glands, liver, and adipose tissue at 10–46× plasma concentration and central nervous system, gonad, and eye concentrations at 1–1/2× plasma concentration.

== Research ==
Probucol has been found to have antioxidant and anti-inflammatory properties via several different mechanisms. These properties have led to research into the drug's potential capacity to treat sensorineural hearing loss related to oxidative stress, as well as formulations to improve the delivery of the drug into the ear.

After promising test results in mouse models, probucol is under study at Weston Brain Institute of McGill University as a possible aid in delaying the onset of Alzheimer's disease. The protocol for a future Australian Phase II study was published in 2022.

Novel packaging methods have been tried to optimize the pharmacokinetic properties of probucol – the goal is usually to produce a more stable absorption profile and to reduce absorption by cardiac muscle cells. Some show promise in lab animals, but have not yet been tested in humans.

=== Analogues ===
A number of probucol analogues have been tested in animal models by researchers seeking to optimize aspects of probucol's action while reducing its side effects. Succinobucol, the succinate ester of probucol, failed to demonstrate a useful degree of efficacy in clinical trials targeting acute coronary syndrome. BO-653, another analogue, failed its phase II trial targeting atherosclerosis treatment and prevention of post-angioplasty restenosis.

== Society and culture ==
In Japan, Probucol was available under both the Lorelco brand name, the Sinlestal brand name, and the generic "TOWA" brand. In January 2021, Towa Pharmaceutical Co., Ltd. announced that it would discontinue the sale of Probucol Tablets 250 mg "TOWA" due to various circumstances.
