= Dextrothyroxine =

Chemical compound

Clinical data
- Trade names: Choloxin
- Other names: D-3,5,3',5'-tetraiodothyronine
- AHFS/Drugs.com: Multum Consumer Information
- ATC code: C10AX01 (WHO)

Identifiers
- IUPAC name: (2R)-2-amino-3-[4-(4-hydroxy-3,5-diiodophenoxy)-3,5-diiodophenyl]propanoic acid
- CAS Number: 51-49-0
- PubChem CID: 8730
- DrugBank: DB00509
- ChemSpider: 8402
- UNII: 4W9K63FION
- ChEBI: CHEBI:30659
- ChEMBL: ChEMBL559
- CompTox Dashboard (EPA): DTXSID60199000
- ECHA InfoCard: 100.000.094

Chemical and physical data
- Formula: C_{15}H_{11}I_{4}NO_{4}
- Molar mass: 776.874 g·mol^{−1}
- 3D model (JSmol): Interactive image
- SMILES: O=C(O)[C@H](N)Cc2cc(I)c(Oc1cc(I)c(O)c(I)c1)c(I)c2
- InChI: InChI=1S/C15H11I4NO4/c16-8-4-7(5-9(17)13(8)21)24-14-10(18)1-6(2-11(14)19)3-12(20)15(22)23/h1-2,4-5,12,21H,3,20H2,(H,22,23)/t12-/m1/s1; Key:XUIIKFGFIJCVMT-GFCCVEGCSA-N

Dextrothyroxine (trade name Choloxin) is a dextrorotary isomer of thyroxine. It saw research as a cholesterol-lowering drug but was pulled due to cardiac side-effects. It increases hepatic lipase which in turn improves utilization of triglycerides and decreases levels of lipoprotein(a) in blood serum.
