= Ciprofibrate =

Chemical compound

Clinical data
- AHFS/Drugs.com: International Drug Names
- ATC code: C10AB08 (WHO)

Identifiers
- IUPAC name: (RS)-2-[4-(2,2-dichlorocyclopropyl)phenoxy]-2- methylpropanoic acid
- CAS Number: 52214-84-3
- PubChem CID: 2763
- IUPHAR/BPS: 3438
- ChemSpider: 2661
- UNII: F8252JGO9S
- KEGG: D03521
- ChEBI: CHEBI:50867
- ChEMBL: ChEMBL557555
- CompTox Dashboard (EPA): DTXSID8020331
- ECHA InfoCard: 100.052.478

Chemical and physical data
- Formula: C_{13}H_{14}Cl_{2}O_{3}
- Molar mass: 289.15 g·mol^{−1}
- 3D model (JSmol): Interactive image
- Chirality: Racemic mixture
- SMILES: ClC2(Cl)CC2c1ccc(OC(C(=O)O)(C)C)cc1
- InChI: InChI=1S/C13H14Cl2O3/c1-12(2,11(16)17)18-9-5-3-8(4-6-9)10-7-13(10,14)15/h3-6,10H,7H2,1-2H3,(H,16,17); Key:KPSRODZRAIWAKH-UHFFFAOYSA-N

Ciprofibrate is a fibrate that was developed as a lipid-lowering agent.

It was patented in 1972 and approved for medical use in 1985.
