= Clinofibrate =

Chemical compound

Clinical data
- AHFS/Drugs.com: International Drug Names
- Routes of administration: Oral
- ATC code: none

Legal status
- Legal status: In general: ℞ (Prescription only)

Identifiers
- IUPAC name: 2-(4-{1-[4-(1-carboxy-1-methylpropoxy)phenyl]cyclohexyl}phenoxy)-2-methylbutanoic acid
- CAS Number: 30299-08-2
- PubChem CID: 2787
- DrugBank: DB09006
- ChemSpider: 21613360
- UNII: 0374EZJ8CU
- KEGG: D01300
- ChEMBL: ChEMBL1897738
- CompTox Dashboard (EPA): DTXSID6046638

Chemical and physical data
- Formula: C_{28}H_{36}O_{6}
- Molar mass: 468.590 g·mol^{−1}
- 3D model (JSmol): Interactive image
- SMILES: CCC(C)(C(=O)O)OC1=CC=C(C=C1)C2(CCCCC2)C3=CC=C(C=C3)OC(C)(CC)C(=O)O
- InChI: InChI=1S/C28H36O6/c1-5-26(3,24(29)30)33-22-15-13-20(14-16-22)28(17-8-7-9-18-28)21-11-10-12-23(19-21)34-27(4,6-2)25(31)32/h10-16,19H,5-9,17-18H2,1-4H3,(H,29,30)(H,31,32); Key:OGGAHXJZRRGBTK-UHFFFAOYSA-N

Clinofibrate (INN; trade name Lipoclin) is pharmaceutical drug of the fibrate class that is used for managing hyperlipidemia and associated conditions. It is sold and marketed in Japan.

Chemically, it is a derivative of bisphenol Z.

== Synthesis ==
The condensation between cyclohexanone (1) and phenol (2) gives bisphenol Z (3). This is treated with chloroform and methyl ethyl ketone (MEK) in the presence of base. The resulting Bargellini reaction gives clinofibrate (4).

Synthesis of clinofibrate
