= Colextran =

Chemical compound

Clinical data
- AHFS/Drugs.com: International Drug Names
- ATC code: C10AC03 (WHO)

Identifiers
- CAS Number: 9015-73-0
- ChemSpider: none
- KEGG: D07744
- CompTox Dashboard (EPA): DTXSID40864168
- ECHA InfoCard: 100.132.944

Chemical and physical data
- Formula: C_{12} H_{23} NO_{6} X_{2}
- Molar mass: 277.315

Colextran (INN) is a bile acid sequestrant. Chemically, it is an ether of dextran and diethylethanolamine.
