= Peroxisome proliferator-activated receptor =

Group of nuclear receptor proteins

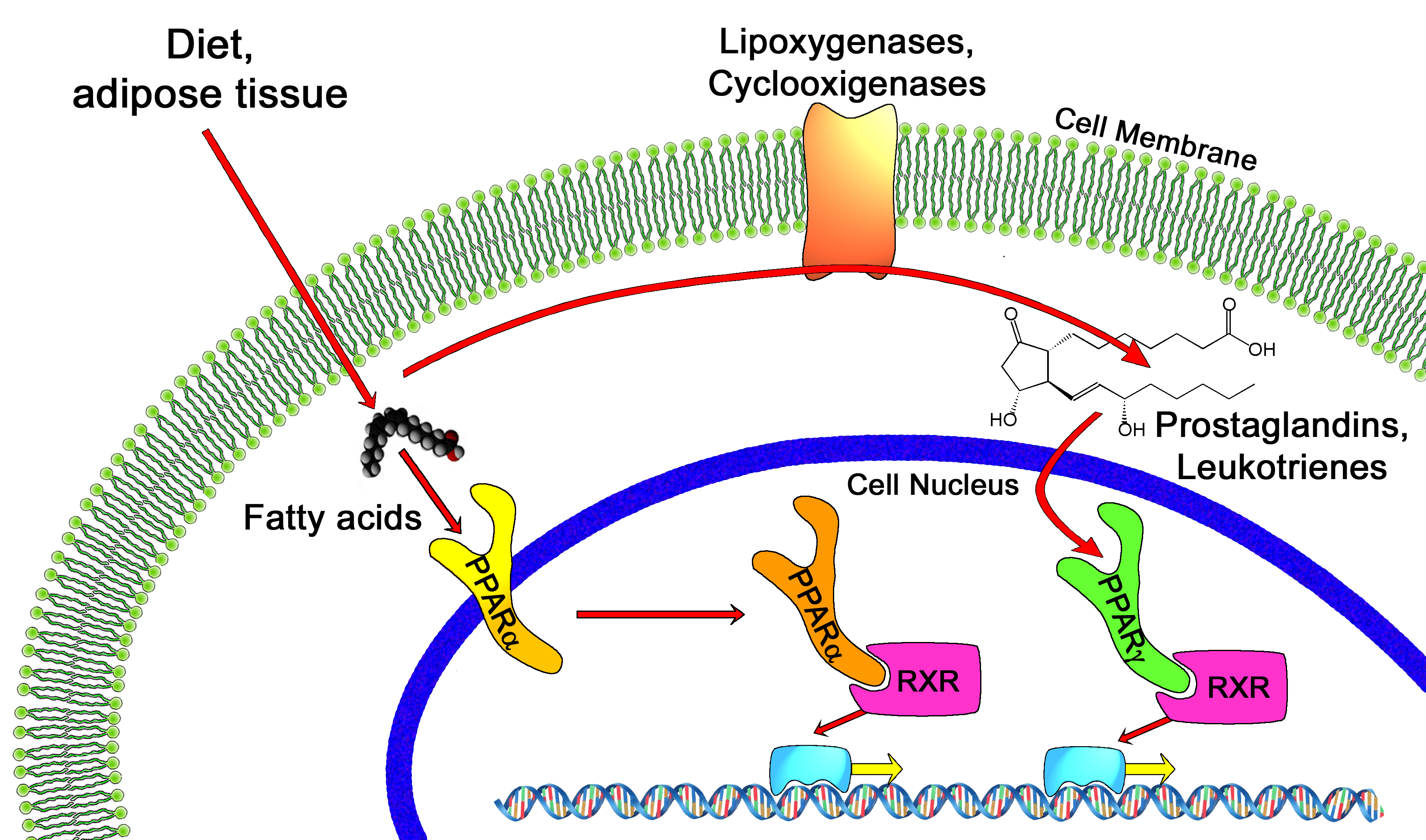
PPAR -alpha and -gamma pathways. Abbreviation: RXR, retinoid X receptor.

In the field of molecular biology, the peroxisome proliferator–activated receptors (PPARs) are a group of nuclear receptor proteins that function as transcription factors regulating gene expression. PPARs play essential roles in regulating cellular differentiation, development, and metabolism (carbohydrate, lipid, protein), and tumorigenesis

== Nomenclature and tissue distribution ==
Peroxisome proliferator-activated receptor alpha

Identifiers
- Symbol: PPARA
- Alt. symbols: PPAR
- NCBI gene: 5465
- HGNC: 9232
- OMIM: 170998
- RefSeq: NM_001001928
- UniProt: Q07869

Other data
- Locus: Chr. 22 q12-q13.1
Search for
- Structures: Swiss-model
- Domains: InterPro

Peroxisome proliferator-activated receptor gamma
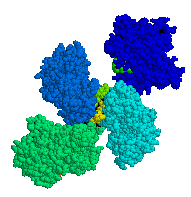

Identifiers
- Symbol: PPARG
- NCBI gene: 5468
- HGNC: 9236
- OMIM: 601487
- RefSeq: NM_005037
- UniProt: P37231

Other data
- Locus: Chr. 3 p25
Search for
- Structures: Swiss-model
- Domains: InterPro

Peroxisome proliferator-activated receptor delta

Identifiers
- Symbol: PPARD
- NCBI gene: 5467
- HGNC: 9235
- OMIM: 600409
- RefSeq: NM_006238
- UniProt: Q03181

Other data
- Locus: Chr. 6 p21.2
Search for
- Structures: Swiss-model
- Domains: InterPro

Three types of PPARs have been identified: alpha, gamma, and delta (beta):

- α (alpha) - expressed in liver, kidney, heart, muscle, adipose tissue, and others
- β/δ (beta/delta) - expressed in many tissues, especially in brain, adipose tissue, and skin
- γ (gamma) - although encoded by the same gene, this PPAR, by way of alternative splicing, is expressed in three forms:
  - γ1 - expressed in virtually all tissues, including heart, muscle, colon, kidney, pancreas, and spleen
  - γ2 - expressed mainly in adipose tissue; it is 30 amino acids longer than γ1
  - γ3 - expressed in macrophages, large intestine, white adipose tissue

== History ==
The first PPAR (PPARα) was discovered in 1990 during the search for a molecular target of a group of agents then referred to as peroxisome proliferators, as they increased peroxisomal numbers in rodent liver tissue, apart from improving insulin sensitivity. These agents, pharmacologically related to the fibrates, were discovered in the early 1980s. When it turned out that PPARs played a versatile role in biology, the agents were in turn termed PPAR ligands. The best-known PPAR ligands are the thiazolidinediones.

PPARs were identified in Xenopus frogs as receptors that induce the proliferation of peroxisomes in cells in 1992. After PPARδ (delta) was identified in humans in 1992, it turned out to be closely related to PPARβ (beta), previously described during the same year in an amphibian, Xenopus. The term "PPARδ" is generally used in the US, while "PPARβ" has remained in Europe, where this receptor was initially discovered.

PPARs were named because they induce peroxisome proliferation in rodents, but this induction has not been verified in humans.

== Physiological function ==
All PPARs heterodimerize with the retinoid X receptor (RXR) and bind to specific regions on the DNA of target genes. These DNA sequences are termed PPREs (peroxisome proliferator hormone response elements). The DNA consensus sequence is AGGTCANAGGTCA, with N being any nucleotide. In general, this sequence occurs in the promoter region of a gene, and, when the PPAR binds its ligand, transcription of target genes is increased or decreased, depending on the gene. The RXR also forms a heterodimer with a number of other receptors (e.g., vitamin D and thyroid hormone).

The function of PPARs is modified by the precise shape of their ligand-binding domain (see below) induced by ligand binding and by a number of coactivator and corepressor proteins, the presence of which can stimulate or inhibit receptor function, respectively.

Endogenous ligands for the PPARs include free fatty acids, eicosanoids and Vitamin B3. PPARγ is activated by PGJ_{2} (a prostaglandin) and certain members of the 5-HETE family of arachidonic acid metabolites including 5-oxo-15(S)-HETE and 5-oxo-ETE. In contrast, PPARα is activated by leukotriene B_{4}. Certain members of the 15-hydroxyeicosatetraenoic acid family of arachidonic acid metabolites, including 15(S)-HETE, 15(R)-HETE, and 15-HpETE activate to varying degrees PPAR alpha, beta/delta, and gamma. In addition, PPARγ was reported to be involved in cancer pathogenesis and growth. PPARγ activation by agonist RS5444 may inhibit anaplastic thyroid cancer growth. See for a review and critique of the roles of PPAR gamma in cancer.

== Genetics ==
The three main forms of PPAR are transcribed from different genes in humans:

- PPARα - chromosome 22q12-13.1 (OMIM 170998)
- PPARβ/δ - chromosome 6p21.2-21.1 (OMIM 600409)
- PPARγ - chromosome 3p25 (OMIM 601487).

Hereditary disorders of all 3 of these PPARs have been described, generally leading to a loss in function and concomitant lipodystrophy, insulin resistance, and/or acanthosis nigricans. Of PPARγ, a gain-of-function mutation has been described and studied: Pro12Ala, which decreases the risk of insulin resistance. It is quite prevalent, with an allele frequency of 0.03 - 0.12 in some populations. In contrast, pro115gln is associated with obesity. Certain other polymorphisms in PPAR show a high incidence in populations with elevated body mass indexes.

== Structure ==
Like other nuclear receptors, PPARs are modular in structure and contain the following functional domains:

- (A/B) - N-terminal region
- (C) DBD - DNA-binding domain
- (D) - flexible hinge region
- (E) LBD - ligand binding domain
- (F) C-terminal region

The DBD contains two zinc finger motifs, which bind to specific sequences of DNA known as hormone response elements when the receptor is activated.

The LBD has an extensive secondary structure consisting of 13 alpha helices and a beta sheet. Both natural and synthetic ligands can bind to the LBD, either activating or repressing the receptor's activity.

== Pharmacology and PPAR modulators ==
PPARα and PPARγ are the molecular targets of a number of marketed drugs.

For instance the hypolipidemic fibrates activate PPARα.

The anti diabetic thiazolidinediones activate PPARγ.

The synthetic chemical perfluorooctanoic acid activates PPARα while perfluorononanoic acid activates both PPARα and PPARγ.

Berberine reduces the mRNA and protein levels of PPARγ.

Other natural compounds from different chemical classes activate or inactivate PPARγ.

== See also ==
- Metabolic syndrome
- Endocannabinoid system
