= Clofibric acid =

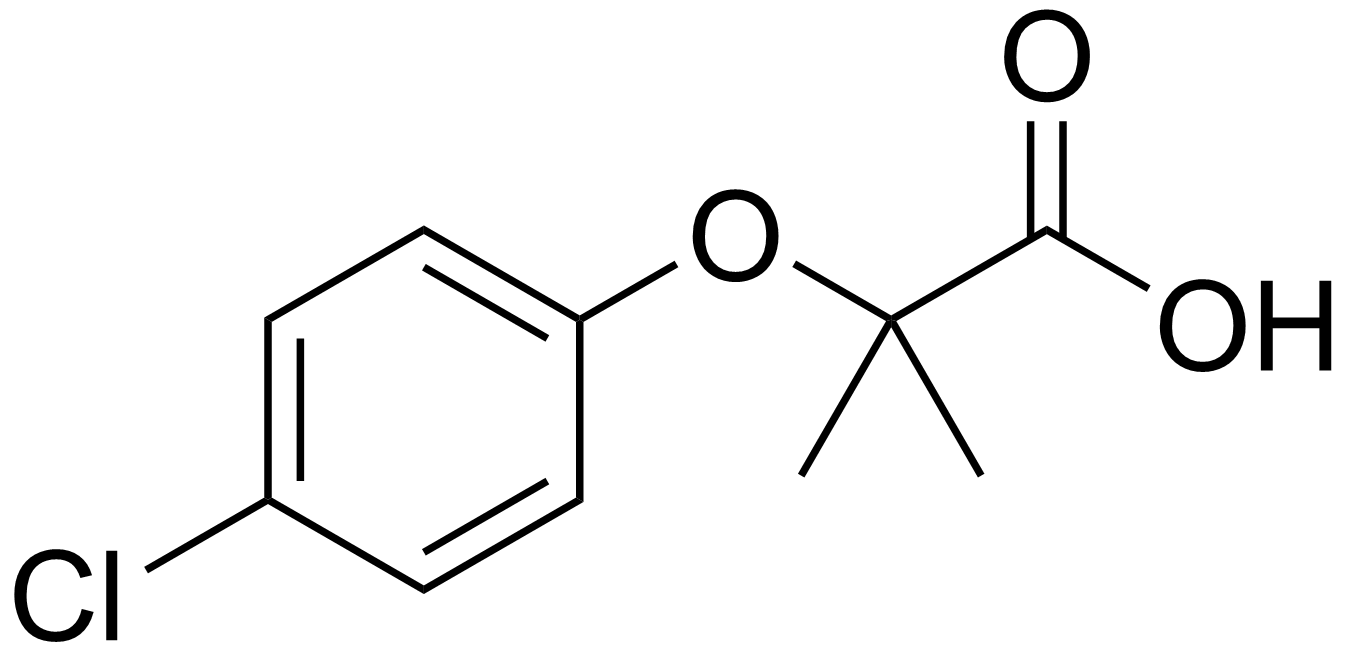

Names
- Preferred IUPAC name 2-(4-Chlorophenoxy)-2-methylpropanoic acid
- Other names Clofibrin; Chlorofibrinic acid Chlorophenoxyisobutyric acid

Identifiers
CAS Number	882-09-7
3D model (JSmol)	Interactive image
ChEBI	CHEBI:34648
ChEMBL	ChEMBL683
ChemSpider	2695
ECHA InfoCard	100.011.751
KEGG	D07723
PubChem CID	2797
UNII	53PF01Q249
CompTox Dashboard (EPA)	DTXSID1040661
- InChI: InChI=1S/C10H11ClO3/c1-10(2,9(12)13)14-8-5-3-7(11)4-6-8/h3-6H,1-2H3,(H,12,13) Key: TXCGAZHTZHNUAI-UHFFFAOYSA-N; InChI=1/C10H11ClO3/c1-10(2,9(12)13)14-8-5-3-7(11)4-6-8/h3-6H,1-2H3,(H,12,13) Key: TXCGAZHTZHNUAI-UHFFFAOYAP
- SMILES: Clc1ccc(OC(C(=O)O)(C)C)cc1

Properties
Chemical formula	C_{10}H_{11}ClO_{3}
Molar mass	214.645 g/mol
Appearance	White to yellow solid
Melting point	118 to 123 °C (244 to 253 °F; 391 to 396 K)
- Except where otherwise noted, data are given for materials in their standard state (at 25 °C [77 °F], 100 kPa). Infobox references

Clofibric acid is a biologically active metabolite of the lipid-lowering drugs clofibrate, etofibrate and theofibrate with the molecular formula C_{10}H_{11}ClO_{3}. It has been found in the environment following use of these drugs, for example in Swiss lakes and the North Sea.

Some derivatives of clofibric acid are in a drug class called fibrates.

== See also ==
- Phenoxy herbicides to which the compound is chemically related
