= Bisphenol Z =

Names
- Preferred IUPAC name 2^{3},2^{4},2^{5},2^{6}-Tetrahydro-2^{2}H-[1^{1},2^{1}:2^{1},3^{1}-terphenyl]-1^{4},3^{4}-diol
- Other names Bis(4-hydroxyphenyl)cyclohexane

Identifiers
CAS Number	843-55-0; 688035-61-2 (hydrate)
3D model (JSmol)	Interactive image
ChEMBL	ChEMBL1231453
ChemSpider	202599
ECHA InfoCard	100.011.525
EC Number	212-677-1
PubChem CID	232446
UNII	64ZF6464QY
CompTox Dashboard (EPA)	DTXSID4047963
- InChI: InChI=1S/C18H20O2/c19-16-8-4-14(5-9-16)18(12-2-1-3-13-18)15-6-10-17(20)11-7-15/h4-11,19-20H,1-3,12-13H2 Key: SDDLEVPIDBLVHC-UHFFFAOYSA-N
- SMILES: C1CCC(CC1)(C2=CC=C(C=C2)O)C3=CC=C(C=C3)O

Properties
Chemical formula	C_{18}H_{20}O_{2}
Molar mass	268.356 g·mol^{−1}
Appearance	White solid
Melting point	188 °C (370 °F; 461 K)

Hazards
- GHS labelling
Pictograms	(GHS07: Exclamation mark)
Signal word	Warning
Hazard statements	H315, H319, H335
Precautionary statements	P261, P264, P271, P280, P302+P352, P304+P340, P305+P351+P338, P312, P321, P332+P313, P337+P313, P362, P403+P233, P405, P501
- Except where otherwise noted, data are given for materials in their standard state (at 25 °C [77 °F], 100 kPa). Infobox references

Bisphenol Z is an organic compound with the formula (HOC_{6}H_{4})_{2}C(CH_{2})_{5}. This white, water-insoluble solid is classified as a bisphenol. It is a precursor to specialty polycarbonate plastics.

It is prepared by the condensation of phenol and cyclohexanone:

== See also ==
- Clinofibrate
