= Nafenopin =

Names
- IUPAC name 2-Methyl-2-[4-(1,2,3,4-tetrahydronaphthalen-1-yl)phenoxy]propanoic acid
- Other names Nafenoic acid

Identifiers
CAS Number	3771-19-5
3D model (JSmol)	Interactive image
ChEBI	CHEBI:7449
ChEMBL	ChEMBL1909070
ChemSpider	18456
KEGG	C11371
PubChem CID	19592
UNII	093W78U96W
CompTox Dashboard (EPA)	DTXSID8020911
- InChI: InChI=1S/C20H22O3/c1-20(2,19(21)22)23-16-12-10-15(11-13-16)18-9-5-7-14-6-3-4-8-17(14)18/h3-4,6,8,10-13,18H,5,7,9H2,1-2H3,(H,21,22) Key: XJGBDJOMWKAZJS-UHFFFAOYSA-N; InChI=1S/C20H22O3/c1-20(2,19(21)22)23-16-12-10-15(11-13-16)18-9-5-7-14-6-3-4-8-17(14)18/h3-4,6,8,10-13,18H,5,7,9H2,1-2H3,(H,21,22); InChI=1S/C20H22O3/c1-20(2,19(21)22)23-16-12-10-15(11-13-16)18-9-5-7-14-6-3-4-8-17(14)18/h3-4,6,8,10-13,18H,5,7,9H2,1-2H3,(H,21,22) Key: XJGBDJOMWKAZJS-UHFFFAOYSA-N
- SMILES: O=C(O)C(Oc1ccc(cc1)C3c2ccccc2CCC3)(C)C

Properties
Chemical formula	C_{20}H_{22}O_{3}
Molar mass	310.393 g·mol^{−1}
- Except where otherwise noted, data are given for materials in their standard state (at 25 °C [77 °F], 100 kPa). verify (what is ?) Infobox references

Nafenopin is a hypolipidemic agent.
