= Gemfibrozil =

Medication

Clinical data
- Trade names: Lopid, others
- AHFS/Drugs.com: Monograph
- MedlinePlus: a686002
- License data: US DailyMed: Gemfibrozil
- Pregnancy category: AU: B3
- Routes of administration: By mouth
- ATC code: C10AB04 (WHO)

Legal status
- Legal status: CA: ℞-only; US: ℞-only; In general: ℞ (Prescription only)

Pharmacokinetic data
- Bioavailability: Close to 100%
- Protein binding: 95%
- Metabolism: Liver (CYP3A4)
- Elimination half-life: 1.5 hours
- Excretion: Kidney 94% Feces 6%

Identifiers
- IUPAC name: 5-(2,5-dimethylphenoxy)-2,2-dimethyl-pentanoic acid
- CAS Number: 25812-30-0
- PubChem CID: 3463
- IUPHAR/BPS: 3439
- DrugBank: DB01241
- ChemSpider: 3345
- UNII: Q8X02027X3
- KEGG: D00334
- ChEBI: CHEBI:5296
- ChEMBL: ChEMBL457
- CompTox Dashboard (EPA): DTXSID0020652
- ECHA InfoCard: 100.042.968

Chemical and physical data
- Formula: C_{15}H_{22}O_{3}
- Molar mass: 250.338 g·mol^{−1}
- 3D model (JSmol): Interactive image
- Melting point: 61 to 63 °C (142 to 145 °F)
- SMILES: O=C(O)C(C)(C)CCCOc1cc(ccc1C)C
- InChI: InChI=1S/C15H22O3/c1-11-6-7-12(2)13(10-11)18-9-5-8-15(3,4)14(16)17/h6-7,10H,5,8-9H2,1-4H3,(H,16,17); Key:HEMJJKBWTPKOJG-UHFFFAOYSA-N

Gemfibrozil, sold under the brand name Lopid among others, is a medication used to treat abnormal blood lipid levels. It is generally less preferred than statins. Use is recommended together with dietary changes and exercise. It is unclear if it changes the risk of heart disease. It is taken by mouth.

Common side effects include headache, dizziness, feeling tired, and intestinal upset. Serious side effects may include angioedema, gallstones, liver problems, and muscle breakdown. Use in pregnancy and breastfeeding is of unclear safety. It belongs to the fibrates group of medications and works by decreasing the breakdown of lipids in fat cells.

Gemfibrozil was patented in 1968, and came into medical use in 1982. It is available as a generic medication. In 2022, it was the 231st most commonly prescribed medication in the United States, with more than 1 million prescriptions.

== Medical uses ==
- Hyperlipidemia (Type III)
- Hypertriglyceridemia (Type IV): Gemfibrozil, though not as effective as niacin (nicotinic acid, a form of Vitamin B3), is better tolerated.
- Reduce triglyceride levels
- Reduce very low density lipoprotein (VLDL) levels
- Modest reduction of low density lipoprotein (LDL) levels
- Moderate increase in high density lipoprotein (HDL) levels

== Side effects ==
- GI distress
- Musculoskeletal pain
- Increased incidence of gallstone
- Hypokalemia (low blood potassium)
- Increased risk of cancer

== Contraindications ==
- Gemfibrozil should not be given to these patients:
  - Hepatic dysfunction
- Gemfibrozil should be used with caution in these higher risk categories:
  - Biliary tract disease
  - Renal dysfunction
  - Pregnant women
  - Obese patients

== Drug interactions ==
- Anticoagulants: Gemfibrozil potentiates the action of warfarin and indanedione anticoagulants.
- Statin drugs: Concomitant administration of fibrates (including gemfibrozil) with statin drugs increases the risk of muscle cramping, myopathy, and rhabdomyolysis.
- Gemfibrozil inhibits the activation of the liver's Cytochrome P450 system and CYP2C8, reducing hepatic metabolism of many drugs, and prolonging their half lives and duration of action.
  - Drugs metabolized by the Cytochrome P450 system include:
    - Many antidepressants
    - Many antipsychotics
    - Many antiepileptics
    - Theophylline and other methylxanthine drugs
    - Several anesthetic agents
    - Oral contraceptive pills
    - Statins
    - Warfarin
    - Selexipag

== Mechanism of actions ==
The exact mechanism of action of gemfibrozil is unknown; however, several theories exist regarding the very low density lipoprotein (VLDL) effect; it can inhibit lipolysis and decrease subsequent hepatic fatty acid uptake as well as inhibit hepatic secretion of VLDL; together these actions decrease serum VLDL levels and increase HDL-cholesterol; the mechanism behind HDL elevation is currently unknown.

Gemfibrozil increases the activity of extrahepatic lipoprotein lipase (LL), thereby increasing lipoprotein triglyceride lipolysis. It does so by activating peroxisome proliferator-activated receptor alpha (PPARα) 'transcription factor ligand', a receptor that is involved in metabolism of carbohydrates and fats, as well as adipose tissue differentiation. This increase in the synthesis of lipoprotein lipase thereby increases the clearance of triglycerides. Chylomicrons are degraded, VLDLs are converted to LDLs, and LDLs are converted to HDL. This is accompanied by a slight increase in secretion of lipids into the bile and ultimately the intestine. Gemfibrozil also inhibits the synthesis and increases the clearance of apolipoprotein B, a carrier molecule for VLDL.

== History ==
Gemfibrozil was selected from a series of related compounds synthesized in the laboratories of the American company Parke-Davis in the late 1970s. It came from research for compounds that lower plasma lipid levels in humans and in animals.

== Environmental data ==
Gemfibrozil has been detected in biosolids (the solids remaining after sewage treatment) at concentrations up to 2650 ng/g wet weight. This indicates that it survives the wastewater treatment process. It is also detected as environmental persistent micropollutant in aquifers and in groundwaters in karstic areas.
