= Fibrate =

Class of chemical compounds

Fibrates
- Drug class
- Fenofibrate, one of the most popular fibrates

Class identifiers
- Use: hypertriglyceridemia and hypercholesterolaemia
- ATC code: C10AB
- Biological target: PPAR

Clinical data
- WebMD: MedicineNet

External links
- MeSH: D058607

Legal status

In pharmacology, the fibrates are a class of amphipathic carboxylic acids and esters. They are derivatives of fibric acid (phenoxyisobutyric acid). They are used for a range of metabolic disorders, mainly hypercholesterolemia (high cholesterol), and are therefore hypolipidemic agents.

== Medical uses ==
Fibrates improve atherogenic dyslipidemia characterized by high triglyceride and/or low HDL-C levels and elevated concentrations of small dense LDL particles, with or without high LDL-C levels. Fibrates may be compared to statin drugs, which reduce LDL-cholesterol (LDL-C) and have only limited effects on other lipid parameters. Clinical trials have shown that the combination of statins and fibrates results in a significantly greater reduction in LDL-C and triglyceride levels and greater increases in high-density lipoprotein cholesterol (HDL-C) compared with monotherapy with either drug. Fibrates are used in accessory therapy in many forms of hypercholesterolemia, but the combination of some fibrates (e.g., gemfibrozil) with statins is contraindicated due to an increased risk of rhabdomyolysis.

Fibrates stimulate peroxisome proliferator activated receptor (PPAR) alpha, which controls the expression of gene products that mediate the metabolism of triglycerides (TG) and high-density lipoprotein (HDL). As a result, synthesis of fatty acids, TG and VLDL is reduced, whilst that of lipoprotein lipase, which catabolises TG, is enhanced. In addition, production of Apo A1 and ATP binding cassette A1 is up-regulated, leading to increased reverse cholesterol transport via HDL. Consequently, fibrates reduce TG by up to 50% and increase HDL-C by up to 20%, but LDL-C changes are variable. Fewer large-scale trials have been conducted with fibrates than with statins and the results are less conclusive, but reduced rates of cardiovascular disease have been reported with fibrate therapy in the subgroup of patients with low HDL-C levels and elevated TG (e.g. TG > 2.3 mmol/L (200 mg/dL)). Fibrates are usually well tolerated but share a similar side-effect profile to statins. In addition, they may increase the risk of cholelithiasis and prolong the action of anticoagulants. Accumulating evidence suggests that they may also have a protective effect against diabetic microvascular complications.

Clinical trials do support their use as monotherapy agents. Fibrates reduce the number of non-fatal heart attacks, but do not improve all-cause mortality and are therefore indicated only in those not tolerant to statins.

Although less effective in lowering LDL levels, the ability of fibrates to increase HDL and lower triglyceride levels seems to reduce insulin resistance when the dyslipidemia is associated with other features of the metabolic syndrome (hypertension and diabetes mellitus type 2). They are therefore used in many hyperlipidemias. Due to a rare paradoxical decrease in HDL-C seen in some patients on fenofibrate, as per US FDA label change, it is recommended that the HDL-C levels be checked within the first few months after initiation of fibrate therapy. If a severely depressed HDL-C level is detected, fibrate therapy should be withdrawn, and the HDL-C level monitored until it has returned to baseline.

== Side effects ==
Most fibrates can cause mild stomach upset and myopathy (muscle pain with CPK elevations). Fibrates decrease the synthesis of bile acid by down-regulation of cholesterol 7 alpha-hydroxylase and sterol 27-hydroxylase expression, therefore making it easier for cholesterol to precipitate and increasing the risk for gallstones.

In combination with statin drugs, fibrates cause an increased risk of rhabdomyolysis, idiosyncratic destruction of muscle tissue, leading to kidney failure. The less lipophilic statins are less prone to cause this reaction, and are probably safer to be combined with fibrates than the more lipophilic statins are.

Drug toxicity includes acute kidney injury.

== Pharmacology ==
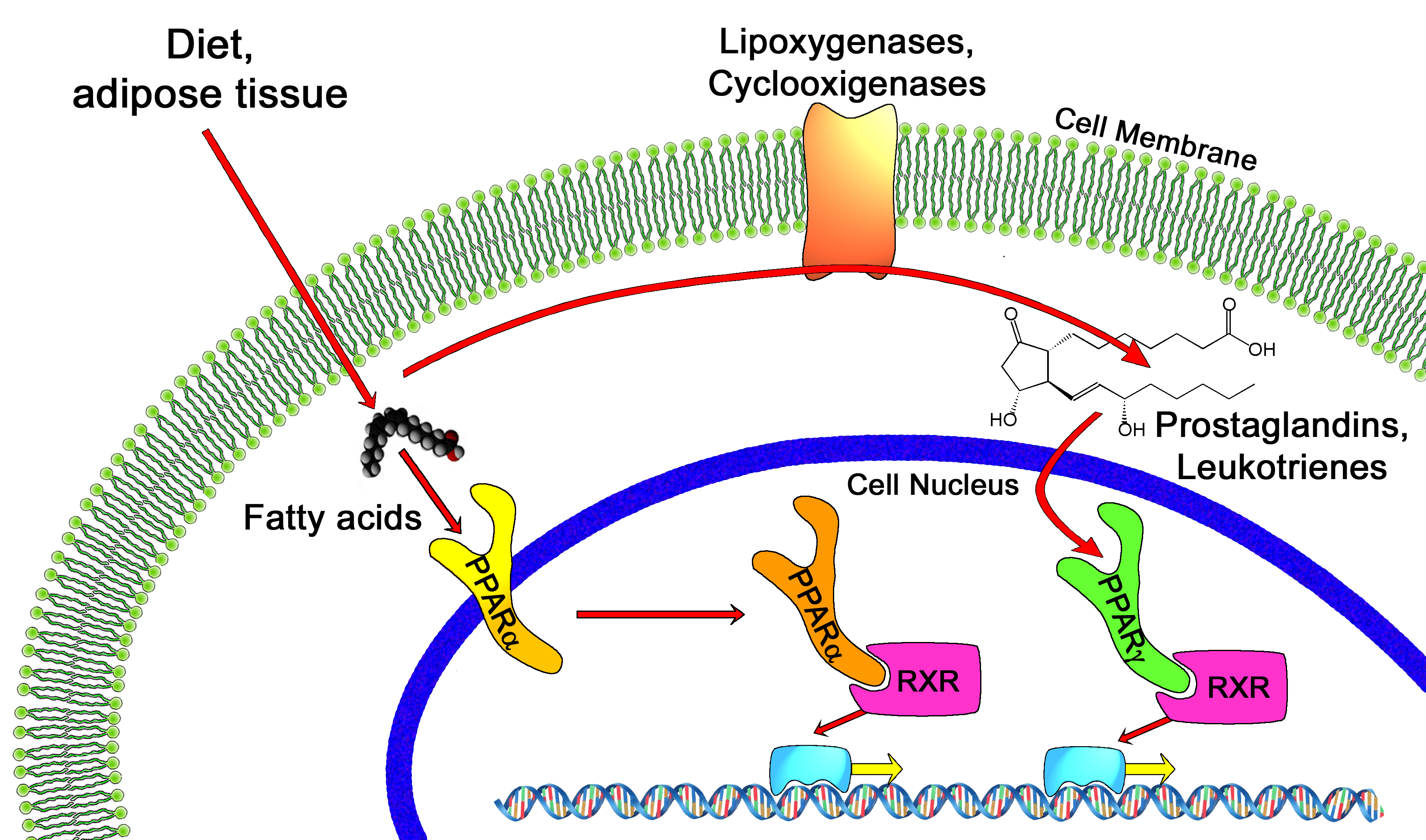
PPAR

Although used clinically since at least 1962, the mechanism of action of fibrates remained unelucidated until the 1990s, when it was discovered that fibrates activate peroxisome proliferator-activated receptors (PPARs), especially PPARα. The PPARs are a class of intracellular receptors that modulate carbohydrate and fat metabolism and adipose tissue differentiation.

Activating PPARs induces the transcription of a number of genes that facilitate lipid metabolism.

Fibrates are pharmacologically related to the thiazolidinediones, a novel class of anti-diabetic drugs that also act on PPARs (more specifically PPARγ)

Fibrates are a substrate of (metabolized by) CYP3A4.

Fibrates have been shown to extend lifespan in the roundworm C. elegans.

== Members ==
Aluminium clofibrate

Bezafibrate

Ciprofibrate

Choline fenofibrate

Clinofibrate

Clofibrate

Clofibride

Fenofibrate

Gemfibrozil

Nafenopin

Ronifibrate

Simfibrate

== See also ==
- Statin
- Hypertriglyceridemia
