= ATC code C10 =

ATC code C10 Lipid modifying agents is a therapeutic subgroup of the Anatomical Therapeutic Chemical Classification System, a system of alphanumeric codes developed by the World Health Organization (WHO) for the classification of drugs and other medical products. Subgroup C10 is part of the anatomical group C Cardiovascular system.

Codes for veterinary use (ATCvet codes) can be created by placing the letter Q in front of the human ATC code: for example, QC10.
National versions of the ATC classification may include additional codes not present in this list, which follows the WHO version.

== C10A Lipid modifying agents, plain ==
=== C10AA HMG CoA reductase inhibitors ===
C10AA01 Simvastatin
C10AA02 Lovastatin
C10AA03 Pravastatin
C10AA04 Fluvastatin
C10AA05 Atorvastatin
C10AA06 Cerivastatin
C10AA07 Rosuvastatin
C10AA08 Pitavastatin

=== C10AB Fibrates ===
C10AB01 Clofibrate
C10AB02 Bezafibrate
C10AB03 Aluminium clofibrate
C10AB04 Gemfibrozil
C10AB05 Fenofibrate
C10AB06 Simfibrate
C10AB07 Ronifibrate
C10AB08 Ciprofibrate
C10AB09 Etofibrate
C10AB10 Clofibride
C10AB11 Choline fenofibrate
C10AB12 Pemafibrate

=== C10AC Bile acid sequestrants ===
C10AC01 Colestyramine
C10AC02 Colestipol
C10AC03 Colextran
C10AC04 Colesevelam

=== C10AD Nicotinic acid and derivatives ===
C10AD01 Niceritrol
C10AD02 Nicotinic acid
C10AD03 Nicofuranose
C10AD04 Aluminium nicotinate
C10AD05 Nicotinyl alcohol (pyridylcarbinol)
C10AD06 Acipimox
C10AD52 Nicotinic acid, combinations

=== C10AX Other lipid modifying agents ===
C10AX01 Dextrothyroxine
C10AX02 Probucol
C10AX03 Tiadenol
C10AX05 Meglutol
C10AX06 Omega-3-triglycerides
C10AX07 Magnesium pyridoxal 5-phosphate glutamate
C10AX08 Policosanol
C10AX09 Ezetimibe
C10AX10 Alipogene tiparvovec
C10AX11 Mipomersen
C10AX12 Lomitapide
C10AX13 Evolocumab
C10AX14 Alirocumab
C10AX15 Bempedoic acid
C10AX16 Inclisiran
C10AX17 Evinacumab
C10AX18 Volanesorsen
C10AX19 Lerodalcibep

== C10B Lipid modifying agents, combinations ==
=== C10BA Combinations of various lipid modifying agents ===
C10BA01 Lovastatin and nicotinic acid
C10BA02 Simvastatin and ezetimibe
C10BA03 Pravastatin and fenofibrate
C10BA04 Simvastatin and fenofibrate
C10BA05 Atorvastatin and ezetimibe
C10BA06 Rosuvastatin and ezetimibe
C10BA07 Rosuvastatin and omega-3 fatty acids
C10BA08 Atorvastatin and omega-3 fatty acids
C10BA09 Rosuvastatin and fenofibrate
C10BA10 Bempedoic acid and ezetimibe
C10BA11 Pravastatin and ezetimibe
C10BA12 Pravastatin, ezetimibe and fenofibrate
C10BA13 Pitavastatin and ezetimibe
C10BA14 Pitavastatin and fenofibrate
C10BA15 Rosuvastatin, ezetimibe and fenofibrate
C10BA16 Atorvastatin and fenofibrate

=== C10BX Lipid modifying agents in combination with other drugs ===
C10BX01 Simvastatin and acetylsalicylic acid
C10BX02 Pravastatin and acetylsalicylic acid
C10BX03 Atorvastatin and amlodipine
C10BX04 Simvastatin, acetylsalicylic acid and ramipril
C10BX05 Rosuvastatin and acetylsalisylic acid
C10BX06 Atorvastatin, acetylsalicylic acid and ramipril
C10BX07 Rosuvastatin, amlodipine and lisinopril
C10BX08 Atorvastatin and acetylsalicylic acid
C10BX09 Rosuvastatin and amlodipine
C10BX10 Rosuvastatin and valsartan
C10BX11 Atorvastatin, amlodipine and perindopril
C10BX12 Atorvastatin, acetylsalicylic acid and perindopril
C10BX13 Rosuvastatin, perindopril and indapamide
C10BX14 Rosuvastatin, amlodipine and perindopril
C10BX15 Atorvastatin and perindopril
C10BX16 Rosuvastatin and fimasartan
C10BX17 Rosuvastatin and ramipril
C10BX18 Atorvastatin, amlodipine and ramipril
C10BX19 Atorvastatin, amlodipine and candesartan
C10BX20 Rosuvastatin and telmisartan
C10BX21 Rosuvastatin and perindopril
C10BX22 Rosuvastatin and nebivolol
C10BX23 Rosuvastatin, amlodipine and ramipril
C10BX24 Rosuvastatin, amlodipine and telmisartan
