= Peroxisome proliferator-activated receptor alpha =

Nuclear receptor protein found in humans

PPARA
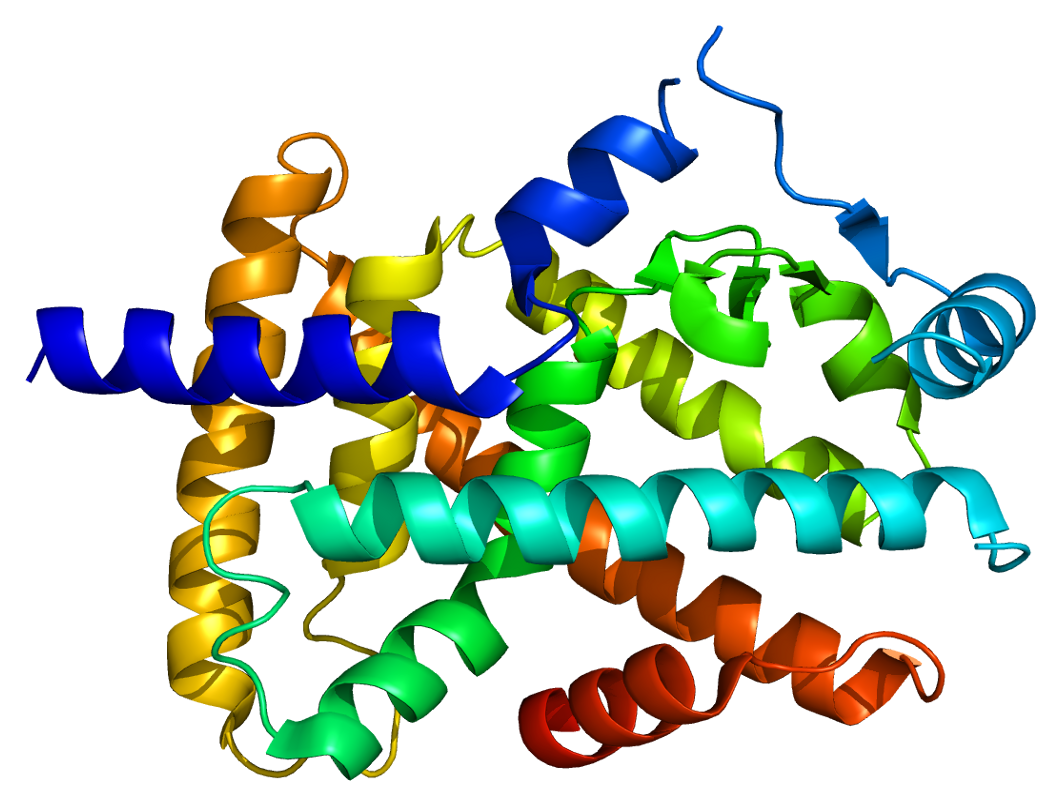

Identifiers
- Aliases: PPARA, NR1C1, PPAR, PPARalpha, hPPAR, peroxisome proliferator activated receptor alpha, PPAR-alpha
- External IDs: MGI: 104740; GeneCards: PPARA
Available structures
PDB	Ortholog search: PDBe RCSB
PDB	List of PDB id codes 1I7G, 1K7L, 1KKQ, 2NPA, 2P54, 2REW, 2ZNN, 3ET1, 3FEI, 3G8I, 3KDT, 3KDU, 3SP6, 3VI8, 4BCR, 4CI4, 5AZT

Gene location (Human)
Chr.	Chromosome 22 (human)
Band	22q13.31	Start	46,150,521 bp
Band	22q13.31	End	46,243,755 bp

Gene location (Mouse)
Chr.	Chromosome 15 (mouse)
Band	15 E2|15 40.42 cM	Start	85,619,184 bp
Band	15 E2|15 40.42 cM	End	85,687,020 bp
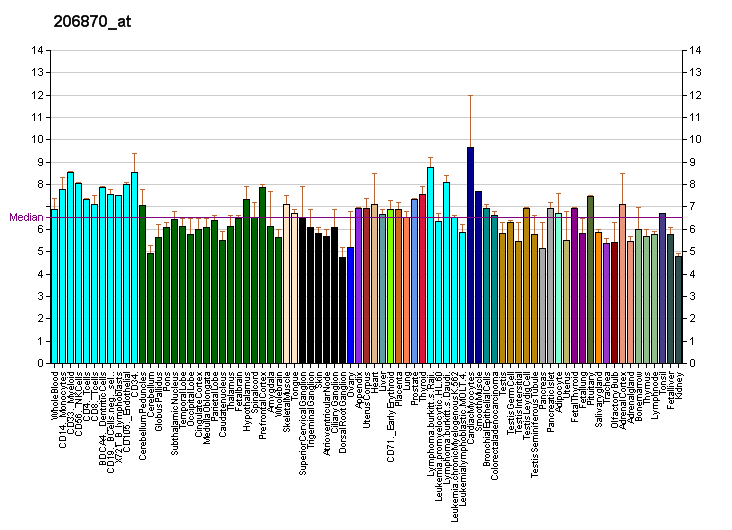

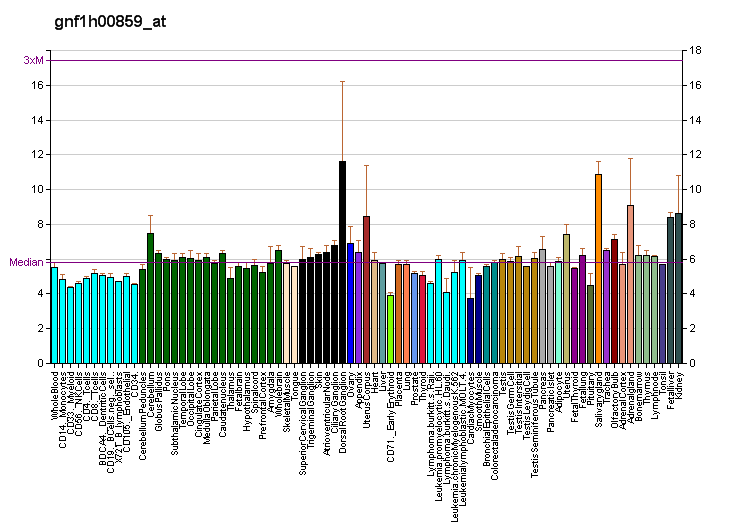
RNA expression pattern
Bgee	Human / Mouse (ortholog); Top expressed in: renal medulla; jejunal mucosa; biceps brachii; Skeletal muscle tissue of biceps brachii; right lobe of liver; retinal pigment epithelium; muscle of thigh; right ventricle; body of tongue; mucosa of sigmoid colon / Top expressed in: left lobe of liver; right kidney; intercostal muscle; brown adipose tissue; digastric muscle; human kidney; sternocleidomastoid muscle; thoracic diaphragm; soleus muscle; transitional epithelium of urinary bladder; More reference expression data
BioGPS	More reference expression data
Gene ontology
Molecular function	DNA binding; sequence-specific DNA binding; protein domain specific binding; DNA-binding transcription factor activity; zinc ion binding; DNA-binding transcription activator activity, RNA polymerase II-specific; metal ion binding; RNA polymerase II cis-regulatory region sequence-specific DNA binding; steroid hormone receptor activity; DNA-binding transcription repressor activity, RNA polymerase II-specific; nuclear receptor activity; protein binding; ubiquitin conjugating enzyme binding; lipid binding; transcription factor binding; DNA-binding transcription factor activity, RNA polymerase II-specific; signaling receptor activity; protein-containing complex binding; transcription coactivator binding; phosphatase binding; NFAT protein binding; MDM2/MDM4 family protein binding; transcription cis-regulatory region binding; RNA polymerase II transcription regulatory region sequence-specific DNA binding; fatty acid binding; nuclear receptor coactivator activity
Cellular component	nucleus; nucleoplasm; RNA polymerase II transcription regulator complex
Biological process	lipoprotein metabolic process; negative regulation of pri-miRNA transcription by RNA polymerase II; positive regulation of fatty acid beta-oxidation; negative regulation of glycolytic process; response to hypoxia; regulation of transcription, DNA-templated; negative regulation of blood pressure; lipid metabolism; rhythmic process; wound healing; negative regulation of leukocyte cell-cell adhesion; negative regulation of transcription by RNA polymerase II; fatty acid transport; negative regulation of protein binding; negative regulation of appetite; circadian regulation of gene expression; transcription, DNA-templated; fatty acid metabolic process; behavioral response to nicotine; positive regulation of transcription, DNA-templated; negative regulation of cholesterol storage; response to insulin; development of the heart; intracellular receptor signaling pathway; negative regulation of transcription regulatory region DNA binding; negative regulation of sequestering of triglyceride; regulation of circadian rhythm; regulation of fatty acid metabolic process; epidermis development; regulation of gene expression; enamel mineralization; positive regulation of gluconeogenesis; transcription initiation from RNA polymerase II promoter; negative regulation of inflammatory response; negative regulation of macrophage derived foam cell differentiation; positive regulation of transcription by RNA polymerase II; steroid hormone mediated signaling pathway; negative regulation of neuron death; positive regulation of fatty acid oxidation; regulation of lipid metabolic process; signal transduction; multicellular organism development; hormone-mediated signaling pathway; cell differentiation; response to lipid; negative regulation of transcription, DNA-templated; negative regulation of cell growth involved in cardiac muscle cell development
Sources:Amigo / QuickGO
Orthologs
Databases	NCBI: entry; OMA: entry
Species	Human	Mouse
Entrez	5465	19013
Ensembl	ENSG00000186951	ENSMUSG00000022383
UniProt	Q07869; Q86SF0	P23204
RefSeq (mRNA)	NM_001001928; NM_001001929; NM_001001930; NM_005036; NM_032644 NM_001362872; NM_001362873; NM_001393941; NM_001393942; NM_001393943; NM_001393944; NM_001393945; NM_001393946; NM_001393947	NM_001113418; NM_011144
RefSeq (protein)	NP_001001928; NP_005027; NP_001349801; NP_001349802	NP_001106889; NP_035274
Location (UCSC)	Chr 22: 46.15 – 46.24 Mb	Chr 15: 85.62 – 85.69 Mb
PubMed search
- Wikidata
View/Edit Human	View/Edit Mouse

Peroxisome proliferator-activated receptor alpha (PPAR-α), also known as NR1C1 (nuclear receptor subfamily 1, group C, member 1), is a nuclear receptor protein functioning as a transcription factor that in humans is encoded by the PPARA gene. Together with peroxisome proliferator-activated receptor delta and peroxisome proliferator-activated receptor gamma, PPAR-alpha is part of the subfamily of peroxisome proliferator-activated receptors. It was the first member of the PPAR family to be cloned in 1990 by Stephen Green and has been identified as the nuclear receptor for a diverse class of rodent hepatocarcinogens that causes proliferation of peroxisomes.

== Expression ==
PPAR-α is primarily activated through ligand binding. Endogenous ligands include fatty acids such as arachidonic acid as well as other polyunsaturated fatty acids and various fatty acid-derived compounds such as certain members of the 15-hydroxyeicosatetraenoic acid family of arachidonic acid metabolites, e.g. 15(S)-HETE, 15(R)-HETE, and 15(S)-HpETE and 13-hydroxyoctadecadienoic acid, a linoleic acid metabolite.

Steroids dehydroepiandrosterone (DHEA) and its sulfated form DHEA-S have been reported to activate PPARα-mediated gene expression, particularly in rodent models where they induce peroxisomal enzymes involved in fatty acid oxidation. While some studies indicate micromolar-range binding or activation consistent with a ligand role, other research suggests DHEA may activate PPARα partly through indirect mechanisms such as modulation of receptor phosphorylation rather than classical direct high-affinity binding, with possible species differences.

Synthetic ligands include the fibrate drugs, which are used to treat hyperlipidemia, and a diverse set of insecticides, herbicides, plasticizers, and organic solvents collectively referred to as peroxisome proliferators.

== Function ==
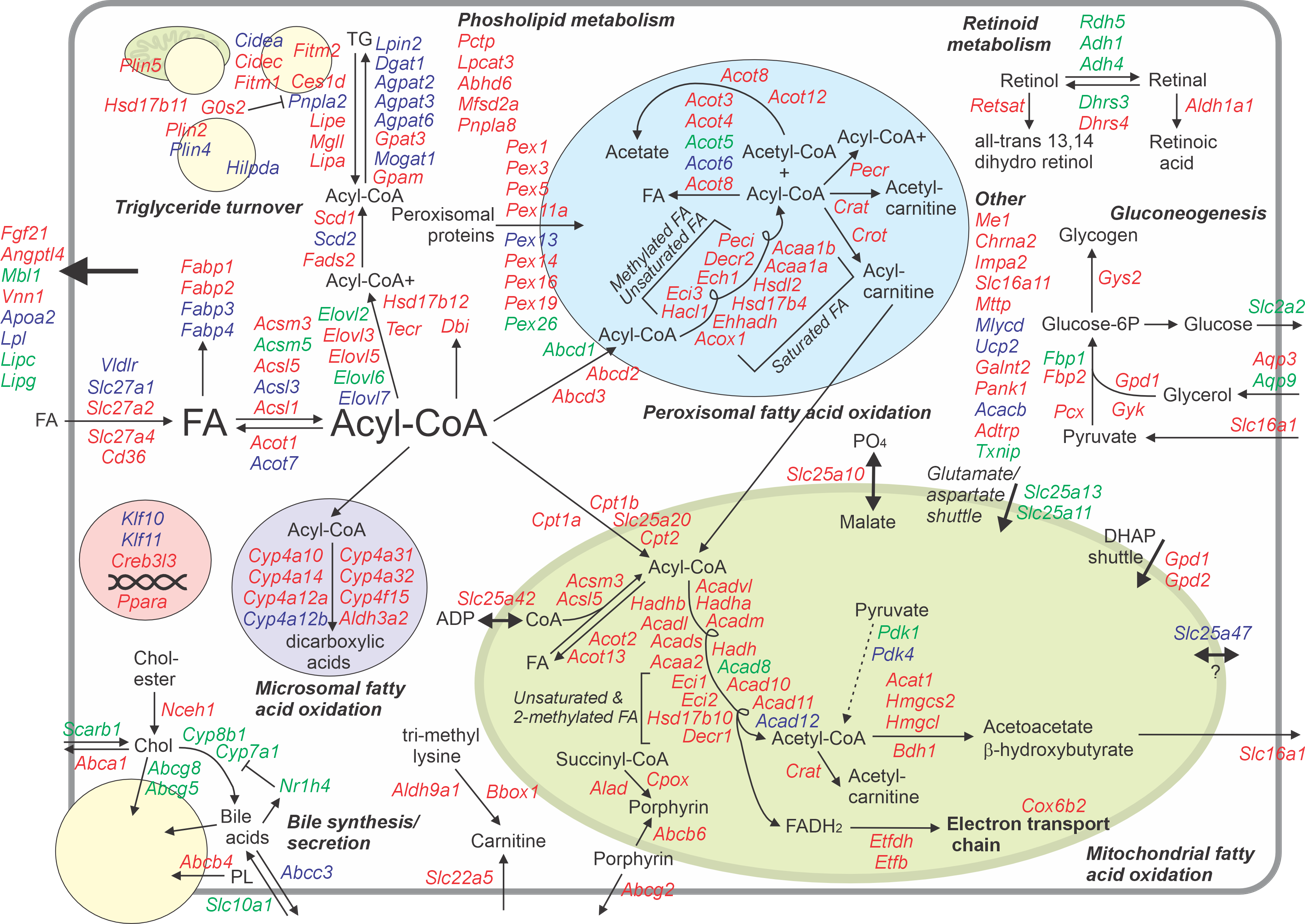
Mouse liver PPARalpha transcriptome

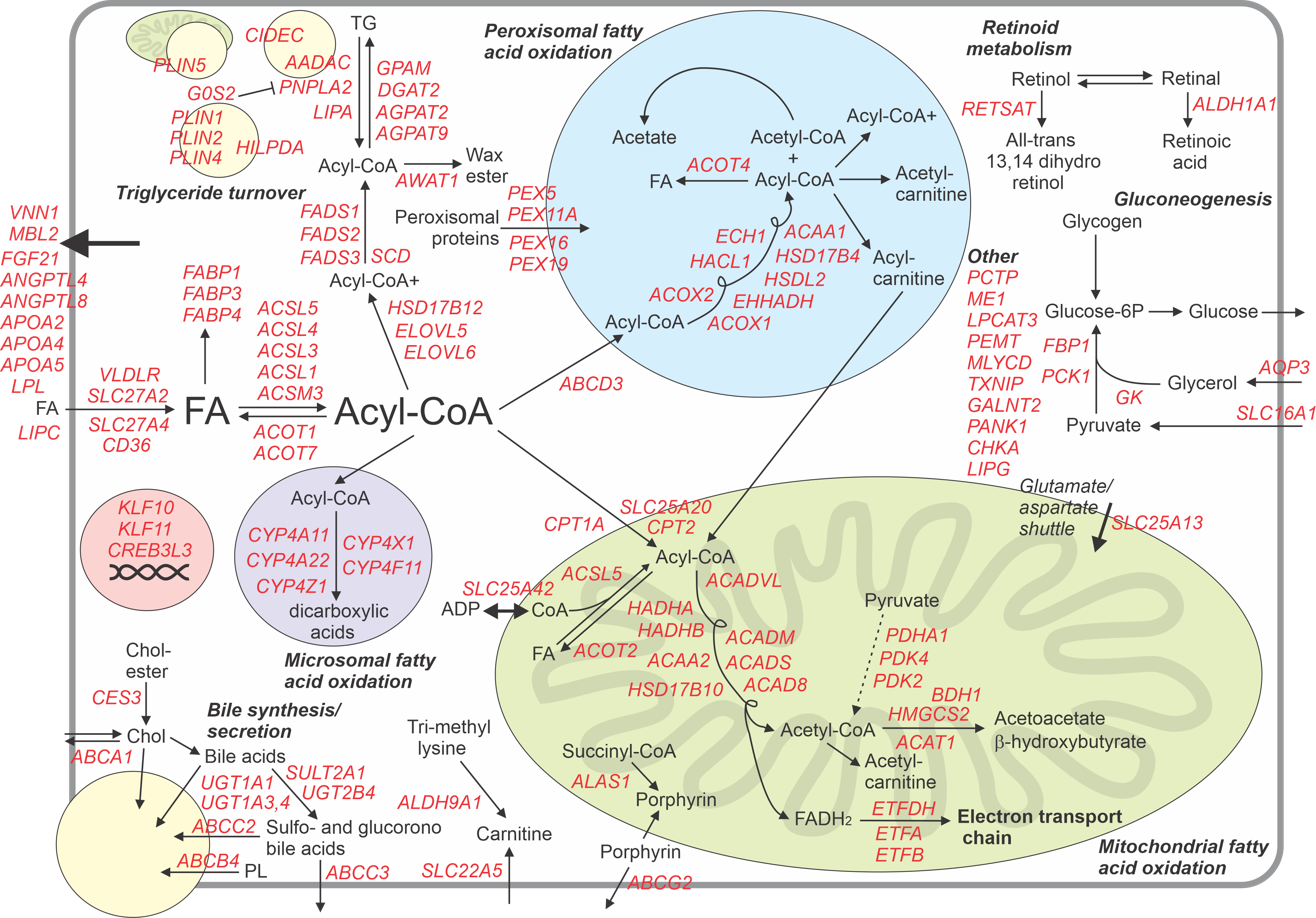
Human hepatocyte PPARalpha transcriptome

PPAR-α is a transcription factor regulated by free fatty acids, and is a major regulator of lipid metabolism in the liver. PPAR-alpha is activated under conditions of energy deprivation and is necessary for the process of ketogenesis, a key adaptive response to prolonged fasting. Activation of PPAR-alpha promotes uptake, utilization, and catabolism of fatty acids by upregulation of genes involved in fatty acid transport, fatty acid binding and activation, and peroxisomal and mitochondrial fatty acid β-oxidation. Activation of fatty acid oxidation is facilitated by increased expression of CPT1 (which brings long-chain lipids into mitochondria) by PPAR-α. PPAR-α also inhibits glycolysis, while promoting liver gluconeogenesis and glycogen synthesis.

In macrophages, PPAR-α inhibits the uptake of glycated low-density lipoprotein (LDL cholesterol), inhibits foam cell (atherosclerosis) formation, and inhibits pro-inflammatory cytokines.

== Tissue distribution ==
Expression of PPAR-α is highest in tissues that oxidize fatty acids at a rapid rate. In rodents, highest mRNA expression levels of PPAR-alpha are found in liver and brown adipose tissue, followed by heart and kidney. Lower PPAR-alpha expression levels are found in small and large intestine, skeletal muscle and adrenal gland. Human PPAR-alpha seems to be expressed more equally among various tissues, with high expression in liver, intestine, heart, and kidney.

== Knockout studies ==
Studies using mice lacking functional PPAR-alpha indicate that PPAR-α is essential for induction of peroxisome proliferation by a diverse set of synthetic compounds referred to as peroxisome proliferators. Mice lacking PPAR-alpha also have an impaired response to fasting, characterized by major metabolic perturbations including low plasma levels of ketone bodies, hypoglycemia, and fatty liver.

== Pharmacology ==
PPAR-α is the pharmaceutical target of fibrates, a class of drugs used in the treatment of dyslipidemia. Fibrates effectively lower serum triglycerides and raises serum HDL-cholesterol levels. Although clinical benefits of fibrate treatment have been observed, the overall results are mixed and have led to reservations about the broad application of fibrates for the treatment of coronary heart disease, in contrast to statins. PPAR-α, agonists may carry therapeutic value for the treatment of non-alcoholic fatty liver disease. PPAR-alpha may also be a site of action of certain anticonvulsants.

An endogenous compound, 7(S)-Hydroxydocosahexaenoic Acid (7(S)-HDHA/"7-HDoHE". PubChem. National Center for Biotechnology Information.), which is a Docosanoid derivative of the omega-3 fatty acid DHA was isolated as an endogenous high affinity ligand for PPAR-alpha in the rat and mouse brain. The 7(S) enantiomer bound with micromolar affity to PPAR alpha with 10 fold higher affinity compared to the (R) enantiomer and could trigger dendritic activation. Previous evidence for the compound's function was speculative based on the structure and study of the chemical synthesis.

Both high sugar and low protein diets elevate the circulating liver hormone FGF21 in humans by means of PPAR-α, although this effect can be accompanied by FGF21-resistance. Amezalpat is an oral, small molecule, selective antagonist of PPAR alpha being developed for treatment of hepatocellular carcinoma by Tempest Therapeutics; it has gained orphan drug and fast track designation by the FDA.

== Target genes ==
PPAR-α governs biological processes by altering the expression of a large number of target genes. Accordingly, the functional role of PPAR-alpha is directly related to the biological function of its target genes. Gene expression profiling studies have indicated that PPAR-alpha target genes number in the hundreds. Classical target genes of PPAR-alpha include PDK4, ACOX1, and CPT1. Low and high throughput gene expression analysis have allowed the creation of comprehensive maps illustrating the role of PPAR-alpha as master regulator of lipid metabolism via regulation of numerous genes involved in various aspects of lipid metabolism. These maps, constructed for mouse liver and human liver, put PPAR-alpha at the center of a regulatory hub impacting fatty acid uptake and intracellular binding, mitochondrial β-oxidation and peroxisomal fatty acid oxidation, ketogenesis, triglyceride turnover, gluconeogenesis, and bile synthesis/secretion.

== Interactions ==
PPAR-α has been shown to interact with:

- AIP,
- EP300
- HSP90AA1,
- NCOA1, and
- NCOR1.
- MECR
- Palmitoylethanolamide (PEA)
- Oleoylethanolamide (OEA)
- Anandamide (AEA)
- 7( S)-Hydroxydocosahexaenoic Acid (7-HDoHE)
- PFAS

== See also ==
- Peroxisome proliferator-activated receptor
- Fibrate
- Endocannabinoid system
