= Lipid-lowering agent =

Fat reducing drug

Lipid-lowering agents, also sometimes referred to as hypolipidemic agents, cholesterol-lowering drugs, or antihyperlipidemic agents are a diverse group of pharmaceuticals that are used to lower the level of lipids and lipoproteins, such as cholesterol, in the blood (hyperlipidemia). The American Heart Association recommends the descriptor 'lipid lowering agent' be used for this class of drugs rather than the term 'hypolipidemic'.

== Classes ==
The several classes of lipid lowering drugs may differ in both their impact on the cholesterol profile and adverse effects. For example, some may lower low density lipoprotein (LDL) levels more so than others, while others may preferentially increase high density lipoprotein (HDL). Clinically, the choice of an agent depends on the patient's cholesterol profile, cardiovascular risk, and the liver and kidney functions of the patient, evaluated against the balancing of risks and benefits of the medications. In the United States, this is guided by the evidence-based guideline most recently updated in 2018 by the American College of Cardiology & American Heart Association.

=== Established ===
- Statins (HMG-CoA reductase inhibitors) are particularly well suited for lowering LDL, the cholesterol with the strongest links to vascular diseases. In studies using standard doses, statins have been found to lower LDL-C by 18% to 55%, depending on the specific statin being used. A risk exists of muscle damage (myopathy and rhabdomyolysis) with statins.
- Fibrates are indicated for hypertriglyceridemia. Fibrates typically lower triglycerides by 20% to 50%. Level of the good cholesterol HDL is also increased. Fibrates may decrease LDL, though generally to a lesser degree than statins. Similar to statins, the risk of muscle damage exists.
- Nicotinic acid, like fibrates, is also well suited for lowering triglycerides by 20–50%. It may also lower LDL by 5–25% and increase HDL by 15–35%. Niacin may cause hyperglycemia and may also cause liver damage. The niacin derivative acipimox is also associated with a modest decrease in LDL. Introduced in 1955.
- Bile acid sequestrants (resins, e.g. cholestyramine) are particularly effective for lowering LDL-C by sequestering the cholesterol-containing bile acids released into the intestine and preventing their reabsorption from the intestine. It decreases LDL by 15–30% and raises HDL by 3–5%, with little effect on triglycerides, but can cause a slight increase. Bile acid sequestrants may cause gastrointestinal problems and may also reduce the absorption of other drugs and vitamins from the gut.
- Ezetimibe is a selective inhibitor of dietary cholesterol absorption.
- Lomitapide is a microsomal triglyceride transfer protein inhibitor.
- PCSK9 inhibitors are monoclonal antibodies for refractory cases. (e.g. Evolocumab, Inclisiran) They are used in combination with statins.
- Probucol decreases LDL independently of the LDL receptor, and decreases HDL-C by enhancing its liver receptor and reducing ABCA1-dependent transport. The reduction of HDL-C, combined with early uncertainties around its mechanism of action, has historically lead to its discontinuation and replacement by statins in Western countries. However, instead of lowering reverse cholesterol transport by HDL particles, probucol seems to increase it. Introduced in the 1970s. It predated the statins by about a decade.

=== Alternative ===
- Lecithin has been shown to effectively decrease cholesterol concentration by 33%, lower LDL by 38% and increase HDL by 46%.
- Phytosterols may be found naturally in plants. Similar to ezetimibe, phytosterols reduce the absorption of cholesterol in the gut, so they are most effective when consumed with meals. However, their precise mechanism of action differs from ezetimibe.
- Omega-3 supplements taken at high doses can reduce levels of triglycerides. They are associated with a very modest increase in LDL (~5%).
- Choline
- Pycnogenol
- Berberine
- Red yeast rice is the natural source from which statins were discovered, but the FDA currently disallows any RYR with significant amounts of statin to be sold as a dietary supplement
- Boswellia serrata
- L-arginine may enhance the effects of a Statin, but will not lead to a reduction in cholesterol alone.
- Flaxseed oil

== Research ==
Investigational classes of hypolipidemic agents:

- CETP inhibitors (cholesteryl ester transfer protein), 1 candidate is in trials. (Anacetrapib) It is expected that these drugs will mainly increase HDL while lowering LDL
- Squalene synthase inhibitor
- ApoA-1 Milano
- Succinobucol (AGI-1067), a novel antioxidant, failed a phase-III trial.
- Apoprotein-B inhibitor mipomersen (approved by the FDA in 2013 homozygous familial hypercholesterolemia.).
- Bempedoic acid, an ATP citrate lyase inhibitor

== See also ==
- ATC code C10
- Ciprofibrate
