= Oxythiamine =

Names
- IUPAC name 5-(2-Hydroxyethyl)-4-methyl-3-[(2-methyl-4-oxo-1,4-dihydropyrimidin-5-yl)methyl]-1,3-thiazol-3-ium
- Other names Oxythiamine, 3-[(2-Methyl-4-oxo-1,4-dihydropyrimidin-5-yl)methyl]-5-(2-hydroxyethyl)-4-methylthiazolium

Identifiers
CAS Number	1119‑97‑7 (base); (HCl): 7485-55-2
3D model (JSmol)	Interactive image; (HCl): Interactive image
ChEBI	CHEBI:78249; (HCl): CHEBI:78246
ChEMBL	ChEMBL3305956
ChemSpider	8358; (HCl): 8357
EC Number	(HCl): 209-483-4
PubChem CID	8682; (HCl): 8681
UNII	1MF36SYZ22; (HCl): WZJ9E9JTCY
CompTox Dashboard (EPA)	DTXSID40929206
- InChI: InChI=1S/C12H15N3O2S/c1-8-11(3-4-16)18-7-15(8)6-10-5-13-9(2)14-12(10)17/h5,7,16H,3-4,6H2,1-2H3/p+1 Key: SRDGSXVLAVRBLU-UHFFFAOYSA-O; (HCl): InChI=1S/C12H15N3O2S.ClH/c1-8-11(3-4-16)18-7-15(8)6-10-5-13-9(2)14-12(10)17;/h5,7,16H,3-4,6H2,1-2H3;1H Key: RNUAEUWXRHCGKX-UHFFFAOYSA-N
- SMILES: CC1=C(SC=[N+]1CC2=CN=C(NC2=O)C)CCO; (HCl): CC1=C(SC=[N+]1CC2=CN=C(NC2=O)C)CCO.[Cl-]

Properties
Chemical formula	C_{12}H_{16}N_{3}O_{2}S^{+} (base); C_{12}H_{17}ClN_{3}O_{2}S (HCl)
Molar mass	266.34 g/mol (base); 301.79 g/mol (HCl)
Solubility in water	Highly soluble in water (hydrochloride)
- Except where otherwise noted, data are given for materials in their standard state (at 25 °C [77 °F], 100 kPa). Infobox references

Oxythiamine (also known as OT) is a chemical analog of vitamin B_{1} (thiamine) and is classified as a thiamine antagonist. In the body, it is converted into its active form, oxythiamine pyrophosphate (OTP), which binds to thiamine-dependent enzymes and inhibits their function.

== Structure and Mode of Action ==
=== Chemical Structure ===
Oxythiamine differs from thiamine in the structure of its pyrimidine ring: the amino group at position 6 is replaced with a keto group, forming pyrimidin-6-one. This alteration modifies the electronic properties of the molecule, affecting its reactivity.

Like thiamine, oxythiamine has a positively charged thiazolium cation, which is neutralized by a chloride ion. The hydroxyethyl side chain, which is important for its function, and the methyl group on the thiazole ring are retained. This structural similarity explains why oxythiamine can bind to the same enzymes as thiamine.

=== Mechanism of Action ===
In the body, thiamine is converted into thiamine pyrophosphate (TPP), an essential coenzyme. TPP plays a critical role in enzymatic reactions by stabilizing reactive intermediates – particularly carbanions – in thiamine-dependent enzymes such as transketolase.

Oxythiamine is also phosphorylated by the enzyme thiamine pyrophokinase, producing oxythiamine pyrophosphate (OTP). While OTP can bind to the same enzymes as TPP, it is unable to stabilize carbanions. This is due to the keto group in OTP, which disrupts electron delocalization in the thiazolium ring. As a result, OTP acts as a competitive inhibitor, blocking enzyme activity without enabling catalysis.

One of OTP's most important targets is transketolase, a key enzyme in the pentose phosphate pathway (PPP). Inhibiting transketolase halts the non-oxidative branch of the PPP, which severely limits the formation of ribose-5-phosphate—a critical precursor for nucleotide synthesis. This inhibition also impairs the generation of NADPH, an essential reducing agent in biosynthesis and antioxidant defense.

Because both nucleotides and NADPH are indispensable for cell growth and division, particularly in rapidly proliferating tumor cells, OTP exerts a selective anti-proliferative effect on such cells.

== Biological Activation ==
Oxythiamine is enzymatically converted into its active form, oxythiamine pyrophosphate (OTP), in a variety of organisms – including bacteria, protozoan parasites, and mammalian cells—through phosphorylation by the enzyme thiamine pyrophokinase. Structurally, OTP closely resembles the natural coenzyme thiamine diphosphate (ThDP or TPP), sharing key functional features that allow it to bind to the same enzymatic sites.

However, unlike ThDP, OTP is catalytically inactive: it fails to support the necessary stabilization of reaction intermediates, thereby preventing normal enzymatic function. By occupying ThDP binding sites without contributing to catalysis, OTP effectively acts as a metabolic decoy, shutting down thiamine-dependent processes.

A pivotal study by Chan et al. demonstrated that overexpression of thiamine pyrophokinase in Plasmodium falciparum – the parasite responsible for malaria – resulted in a 1,700-fold increase in sensitivity to oxythiamine. This strongly indicates that the cytotoxic and antiproliferative effects of oxythiamine are not due to the parent compound itself, but rather to its phosphorylated metabolite, OTP, which functions as the true active antimetabolite.

== Interaction with Thiamine-Dependent Enzymes ==
Oxythiamine (OT) and its active metabolite, oxythiamine pyrophosphate (OTP), inhibit several key enzymes that depend on thiamine diphosphate (ThDP, also known as TPP) as a cofactor. These ThDP-dependent enzymes are critical for central metabolic pathways and include:

- Transketolase (TKT) in the pentose phosphate pathway (PPP)
- Pyruvate dehydrogenase complex (PDHC)
- 2-oxoglutarate dehydrogenase complex (OGDHC)

=== Transketolase (TKT) ===
Transketolase requires ThDP to perform its catalytic function. Oxythiamine pyrophosphate (OTP) competes for the same cofactor binding site, acting as a competitive inhibitor. In cell culture experiments with mammalian and cancer cell lines, oxythiamine significantly reduced transketolase activity, limiting the production of ribose-5-phosphate, a precursor for nucleotide biosynthesis.

This effect is particularly pronounced in rapidly dividing cells, such as tumor cells, which experience a shortage of nucleotide building blocks. This can lead to cell cycle arrest in the G1 phase and initiate apoptosis. Moreover, OTP binds transketolase with high affinity and shows limited reversibility under physiological conditions.

Importantly, OTP also inhibits transketolase isoforms such as TKTL1, which are frequently overexpressed in certain cancers and have been implicated in tumor progression and metastasis.

=== Thiamine Binding to Transketolase: Mechanism of Inhibition ===
The active coenzyme thiamine diphosphate (ThDP) binds with particularly high affinity to human transketolase (TKT). Structural studies have shown that specific amino acids – such as glutamine at position 189 (Gln189) – are essential for cofactor stabilization. Additional stabilizing interactions, involving residues such as Lys75, Ser40, and Lys244, contribute to the near-irreversible binding of ThDP under physiological conditions.

Because oxythiamine pyrophosphate (OTP) cannot easily displace this strongly bound ThDP, oxythiamine primarily acts as a preventive inhibitor. It competes with thiamine for incorporation into newly synthesized enzymes. This results in enzyme variants that are inactive from the outset.

=== Pyruvate Dehydrogenase Complex (PDHC) ===
The pyruvate dehydrogenase complex is a mitochondrial enzyme complex that catalyzes the conversion of pyruvate to acetyl-CoA, serving as a critical link between glycolysis and the citrate cycle. Its E1 subunit requires ThDP as a cofactor. OTP acts as a competitive inhibitor at this site and even exhibits higher binding affinity than ThDP itself: its inhibition constant (Ki) is approximately 0.025 μM, compared to a Km of ~0.06 μM for ThDP.

When PDHC is inhibited by OTP, intracellular pyruvate accumulates and is increasingly diverted to lactate production. Concurrently, acetyl-CoA synthesis declines, reducing input into the citrate cycle and impairing energy metabolism. In high-glucose-demand tissues—such as tumors or rapidly dividing microbes—this disruption can have severe metabolic consequences. In rat models, oxythiamine administration significantly increased blood pyruvate levels, confirming its systemic inhibitory effect on PDHC.

=== 2-Oxoglutarate Dehydrogenase Complex (OGDHC) ===
The 2-oxoglutarate dehydrogenase complex (OGDHC) is another ThDP-dependent enzyme in the citrate cycle. Like PDHC, it is effectively inhibited by oxythiamine pyrophosphate (OTP). Experimental studies have shown that parasites genetically engineered to overexpress OGDHC exhibit reduced sensitivity to oxythiamine – suggesting that excess enzyme can sequester available OTP, thereby preserving partial enzymatic activity.

In tumor cells, oxythiamine treatment has been shown to cause an accumulation of α-ketoglutarate, the substrate of OGDHC. This metabolite plays a key role as a signaling molecule, influencing both epigenetic enzymes and the hypoxia-inducible factor HIF-1α. Elevated α-ketoglutarate levels may promote HIF hydroxylase stabilization, thereby reducing HIF-1α activity—a mechanism with potential anti-metastatic implications.

== Competition with thiamine diphosphate (ThDP) ==
OTP can bind to enzymes that normally rely on thiamine diphosphate (ThDP). Due to its structural similarity, it competes with the natural cofactor for the binding sites on these enzymes. However, unlike ThDP, OTP lacks the electronic properties necessary to stabilize reactive intermediates and therefore fails to support enzymatic catalysis. The result is a functional blockade of metabolic reactions dependent on these enzymes.

Importantly, oxythiamine's inhibitory effect is not limited to direct competition. Once phosphorylated to OTP, it induces a persistent inhibition that continues until sufficient thiamine is available to regenerate active ThDP. Cell culture experiments have demonstrated that high doses of thiamine can partially reverse this inhibition, underscoring its competitive and reversible nature.

However, in many cases, enzyme activity is not fully restored, suggesting that OTP may bind with high affinity or induce structural alterations that lead to long-term enzymatic dysfunction.

== Effects on Cellular Metabolism ==
Inhibition of ThDP-dependent enzymes by oxythiamine pyrophosphate (OTP) disrupts core metabolic pathways, leading to wide-ranging biochemical consequences:

- Pentose Phosphate Pathway (PPP)
- Inhibition of transketolase reduces production of ribose-5-phosphate and erythrose-4-phosphate, impairing nucleotide synthesis and aromatic amino acid biosynthesis.
- NADPH production is indirectly diminished, weakening cellular antioxidant systems (glutathione, thioredoxin) and hampering fatty acid synthesis.
- Tumor cells, reliant on NADPH for redox control, become more sensitive to oxidative stress, reducing their survival potential.

=== Glycolysis and Energy Production ===
- backlog of pyruvate, which is increasingly reduced to lactate - increased anaerobic glycolysis.
- Glycolytic intermediates are diverted into secondary pathways, including methylglyoxal formation, which is cytotoxic.
- This metabolic profile contrasts with the Warburg effect: although glycolysis proceeds, downstream metabolic blocks inhibit proliferation.

=== Citrate cycle ===
- lack of acetyl-CoA and blockade of OGDHC slow down the citrate cycle.
- Increase in α-ketoglutarate with signaling effect.
- Impaired oxidative phosphorylation and ATP synthesis negatively affect cells with high energy requirements.
- In non-proliferating tissues, these disruptions can cause effects resembling vitamin B1 deficiency (e.g., beriberi).

== Pharmacological and Biological Eeffects ==
Oxythiamine is primarily used as a research compound to induce cellular thiamine deficiency in a controlled, selective manner. It serves as a valuable tool in studies of cell metabolism, especially within the fields of oncology, microbiology, parasitology, and immunology.

=== 1. Antitumor effects ===
Oxythiamine has been investigated in numerous in vitro studies with regard to its tumor-inhibiting properties. It inhibits thiamine-dependent enzymes, interferes with cell proliferation, induces apoptosis and influences the cell cycle. The inhibition primarily affects transketolase (TKT) and its isoforms such as TKTL1.

==== Examples of Antitumor Effects in Cell Cultures ====
- Non-small cell lung carcinoma (A549 cells): Dose- and time-dependent inhibition of cell proliferation; >28% reduced viability at 100 μM after 48 h; significantly increased apoptosis rate even at 0.1 μM.
- Pancreatic carcinoma (MIA PaCa-2): Cell proliferation reduced by up to 41%; with DHEA-S up to 61%. Dose-dependent inhibition (IC_{50} ~15 μM), changes in protein expression (e.g. TIMP-1).
- Neuroblastoma (SH-SY5Y cells): Activation of p53, increase in lactate, mitochondrial apoptosis.
- Cervical carcinoma (HeLa cells): Reduction in cell count by up to 80% at 0.005-0.02%; GI_{50}/IC_{50} values in the low μM range.
- Colon adenocarcinoma (HT29 cells): Effect also in chemoresistant lines; combination with DHEA lowers IC_{50}, methotrexate resistance is overcome.
- Ovarian cancer: effect on resistant cell lines; TKT inhibition reduces cell growth.
- Triple-negative breast cancer (TNBC): Combined with chemotherapeutic agents (e.g. doxorubicin, docetaxel) >90% cell reduction, HIF-1α downregulation.
- Thyroid carcinoma (ARO, SW579): Inhibition from 2-3 μM; enhancement by lovastatin.
- Hepatocellular carcinoma (HCC): G1 arrest, increased ROS, decreased glucose uptake, increased apoptosis (especially in combination with sorafenib).
- Lewis lung carcinoma (LLC): Inhibition of migration/invasion; reduction of MMP-2/-9 and uPA, increase of TIMP-1/2.
- Chronic myeloid leukemia (CML): restoration of imatinib sensitivity; reduced cell proliferation.
- Esophageal carcinoma (ESCC): Inhibition of TKT, NADPH/glutathione ↓, ROS ↑, cell cycle arrest and apoptosis.

==== In Vivo Studies ====
- Walker-256 rat model: tumor weight reduced by ~45%, increase in abnormal mitoses.
- 4T1 breast cancer (mouse): Fewer metastases, lower Ki-67, metabolic reprogramming (↑α-ketoglutarate, ↓HIF-1α).
- Ehrlich ascites tumor (EAT): >90% inhibition of proliferation; with DHEA up to 94%; well tolerated.
- LLC (mouse): 150–600 mg/kg/day orally effective; MMP inhibition confirmed.
- Cervical carcinoma (HPV16 E6 model): Reduced tumor size, can be combined with cisplatin.
- Anaplastic thyroid carcinoma: 2-week administration → significant tumor reduction, TKTL1↓.
- HCC (sorafenib-resistant): Combination with sorafenib reduces tumor burden, ROS↑, resensitization.
- CML (imatinib-resistant): Synergistic effect with imatinib despite resistance.
- ESCC:OT reduces tumor growth, DNA damage (γ-H2AX), apoptosis (cleaved caspase-3), HMGA1↓, TKT↓.

=== 2. Virological effects ===
==== Virological Effects / In Vivo Effects ====
- Influenza A, mumps virus: Virus replication was inhibited in chicken egg cells at high OT concentrations - close to toxic dose.
- Chlamydia psittaci: Reduction of infectivity – also dose-dependent.
- Poliovirus (mouse model): Vitamin B1 deficiency due to OT reduces mortality in moderate deficiency, but worsens immune status in severe deficiency.
- NDV, myxoviruses: OT reduced cytopathic effects; cells showed partial protection against virus replication.
- SARS-CoV-2: BOT (lipophilic OT prodrug) inhibited virus replication >90% in Caco-2 cells, without significant cytotoxicity; synergistic effect with 2-deoxyglucose.

==== In vivo / clinical ====
Clinical data are lacking. Old animal studies showed virus inhibition, but also immunological weakening. BOT is discussed as a nasal or inhaled antiviral therapy.

=== 3. Effect Against Parasites (Malaria) ===
==== In Vitro ====
- P. falciparum: Inhibition by OTP of TKT, PDH, OGDH. TPK overexpression increases OT susceptibility (1700-fold), overproduction of target enzymes reduces effect.

==== In Vivo ====
- P. berghei mouse model: OT reduces parasitemia, delays progression, reduces organ burden. High doses are necessary due to weak pharmacokinetics.

==== Further development ====
- N3-pyridylthiamine (N3PT) shows improved activity and stability. Goal: parasite-specific activation, selective uptake, minimal effect on host cells.

=== 4. Antibacterial and Antifungal Effects ===
==== Antibacterial and Antifungal Effects ====
===== Bacteria =====
- Pseudomonas aeruginosa: Moderate inhibition, enhanced effect with antibiotics. OTP interferes with ThDP-dependent enzymes and stress response.
- Effect species-dependent: Gram-positive germs with thiamine transporter more sensitive; others compensate via thiamine biosynthesis.

===== Fungi and Yeasts =====
- Saccharomyces cerevisiae: slower growth, reduced PDC activity, intracellular thiamine↓.
- Malassezia pachydermatis: High sensitivity to OT. Enzymes such as pyruvate decarboxylase and malate dehydrogenase are inhibited.

=== 5. Immunomodulatory Effects ===
- neutrophil granulocytes / NETosis OT inhibits NET release in a dose-dependent manner due to NADPH deficiency; ROS↓; also effective together with thiamine.
- STING-mediated immune response PPP inhibition by OT reduces interferon-α/-β production and ISG expression; antiviral response↓; relevance for cytokine storm discussed.
- Macrophages / phagocytosis OT and 6-aminonicotinamide promote antibody-mediated phagocytosis (ADCP) of lymphoma cells by up to 92%.

== Clinical Experience With Oxythiamine ==
=== Case Report: Prostate Cancer and Benfo-Oxythiamine ===
Case report: Prostate cancer and benfo-oxythiamine. A case report from 2024 describes the combined use of benfo-oxythiamine (B-OT) and [^{177}Lu]PSMA radioligand therapy in a patient with metastatic, refractory prostate cancer. The therapy resulted in:

- Decrease in PSA value
- Regression of metastases in PSMA-PET
- Prolongation of progression-free survival

There was no evidence of systemic thiamine deficiency or other relevant side effects.
