= C11H17NO3 =

The molecular formula C_{11}H_{17}NO_{3} (molar mass: 211.25 g/mol, exact mass: 211.120843 u) may refer to:

- BOHD (psychedelic)
- 2C-O
- Dioxethedrin
- Isomescaline
- Isoprenaline
- Levisoprenaline
- Mescaline, a natural psychedelic alkaloid
- Methoxamine
- Orciprenaline
- 2,4,6-Trimethoxyphenethylamine (ψ-2C-O)
- 2,5-dimethoxy-4-hydroxyamphetamine (DOOH)
