= C12H23N =

The molecular formula C_{12}H_{23}N (molar mass: 181.32 g/mol, exact mass: 181.1830 u) may refer to:

- Dicyclohexylamine
- Dodecanenitrile
- Leptacline
