= DOOH =

DOOH may refer to:

== Marketing ==
- Digital out-of-home

== Science ==
- 2,5-dimethoxy-4-hydroxyamphetamine,
