= CYP2A6 =

Protein found in humans

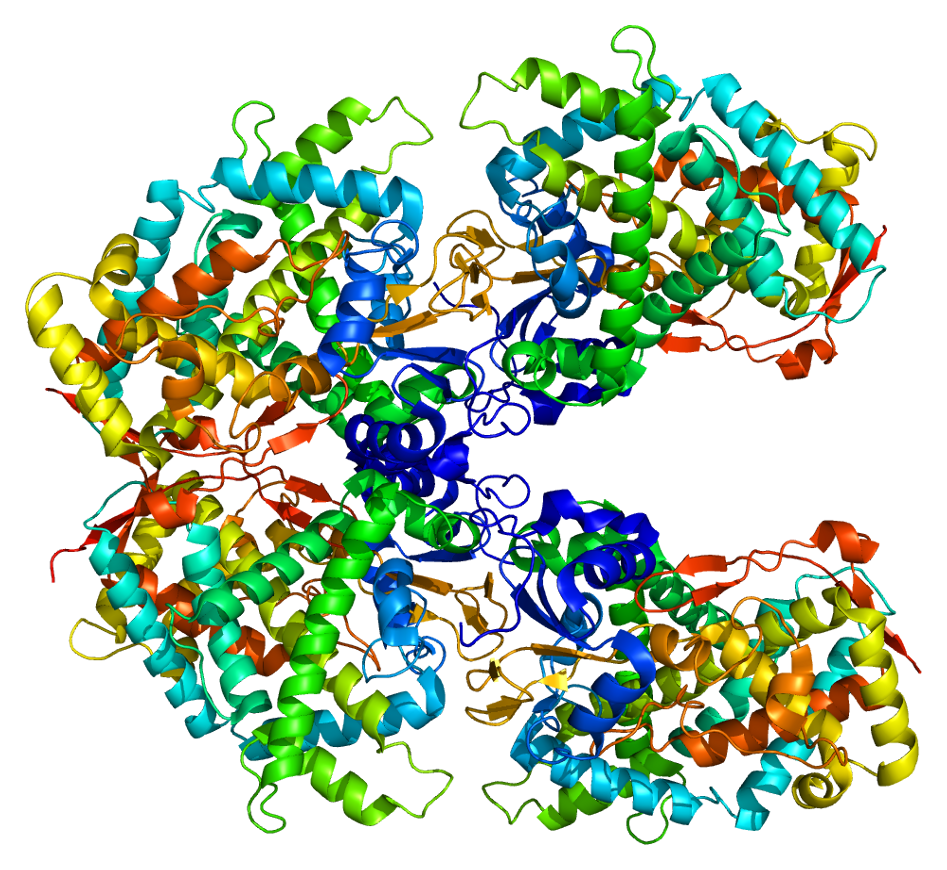

Identifiers
- Aliases: CYP2A6, CPA6, CYP2A, CYP2A3, CYPIIA6, P450C2A, P450PB, cytochrome P450 family 2 subfamily A member 6
- External IDs: OMIM: 122720; MGI: 88597; GeneCards: CYP2A6
Available structures
PDB	Ortholog search: PDBe RCSB
PDB	List of PDB id codes 4RUI, 1Z10, 1Z11, 2FDU, 2FDV, 2FDW, 2FDY, 3EBS, 3T3Q, 3T3R, 4EJJ

Gene location (Human)
Chr.	Chromosome 19 (human)
Band	19q13.2	Start	40,843,541 bp
Band	19q13.2	End	40,850,447 bp

Gene location (Mouse)
Chr.	Chromosome 7 (mouse)
Band	7 A3|7 15.54 cM	Start	26,534,730 bp
Band	7 A3|7 15.54 cM	End	26,542,973 bp
RNA expression pattern
Bgee	Human / Mouse (ortholog); Top expressed in: right lobe of liver; paraflocculus of cerebellum; middle frontal gyrus; frontal pole; Brodmann area 10; nasal epithelium; cerebellar vermis; male germ cell; sperm; thalamus / Top expressed in: proximal tubule; human kidney; right kidney; hepatobiliary system; liver; esophagus; respiratory epithelium; thymus; nasal epithelium; olfactory epithelium; More reference expression data
BioGPS	n/a
Gene ontology
Molecular function	iron ion binding; arachidonic acid epoxygenase activity; oxidoreductase activity, acting on paired donors, with incorporation or reduction of molecular oxygen, reduced flavin or flavoprotein as one donor, and incorporation of one atom of oxygen; metal ion binding; monooxygenase activity; heme binding; oxidoreductase activity, acting on paired donors, with incorporation or reduction of molecular oxygen; enzyme binding; oxidoreductase activity; coumarin 7-hydroxylase activity; steroid hydroxylase activity
Cellular component	organelle membrane; endoplasmic reticulum membrane; membrane; intracellular membrane-bounded organelle; endoplasmic reticulum; cytoplasmic microtubule; cytoplasm
Biological process	steroid metabolic process; epoxygenase P450 pathway; coumarin catabolic process; coumarin metabolic process; organic acid metabolic process; xenobiotic metabolic process
Sources:Amigo / QuickGO
Orthologs
Databases	NCBI: entry; OMA: entry
Species	Human	Mouse
Entrez	1548	13087
Ensembl	ENSG00000255974	ENSMUSG00000005547
UniProt	P11509	P20852
RefSeq (mRNA)	NM_000762	NM_007812
RefSeq (protein)	NP_000753	n/a
Location (UCSC)	Chr 19: 40.84 – 40.85 Mb	Chr 7: 26.53 – 26.54 Mb
PubMed search
- Wikidata
View/Edit Human	View/Edit Mouse

Cytochrome P450 2A6 (abbreviated CYP2A6) is a member of the cytochrome P450 mixed-function oxidase system, which is involved in the metabolism of xenobiotics in the body. CYP2A6 is the primary enzyme responsible for the oxidation of nicotine and cotinine. It is also involved in the metabolism of several pharmaceuticals, carcinogens, and a number of coumarin-type alkaloids. CYP2A6 is the only enzyme in the human body that appreciably catalyzes the 7-hydroxylation of coumarin, such that the formation of the product of this reaction, 7-hydroxycoumarin, is used as a probe for CYP2A6 activity.

The CYP2A6 gene is part of a large cluster of cytochrome P450 genes from the CYP2A, CYP2B and CYP2F subfamilies on chromosome 19q. The gene was formerly referred to as CYP2A3; however, it has been renamed CYP2A6.

== Interactive pathway map ==
Click on genes, proteins and metabolites below to link to respective articles. (Note: The interactive pathway map can be edited at WikiPathways: "FluoropyrimidineActivity_WP1601".)

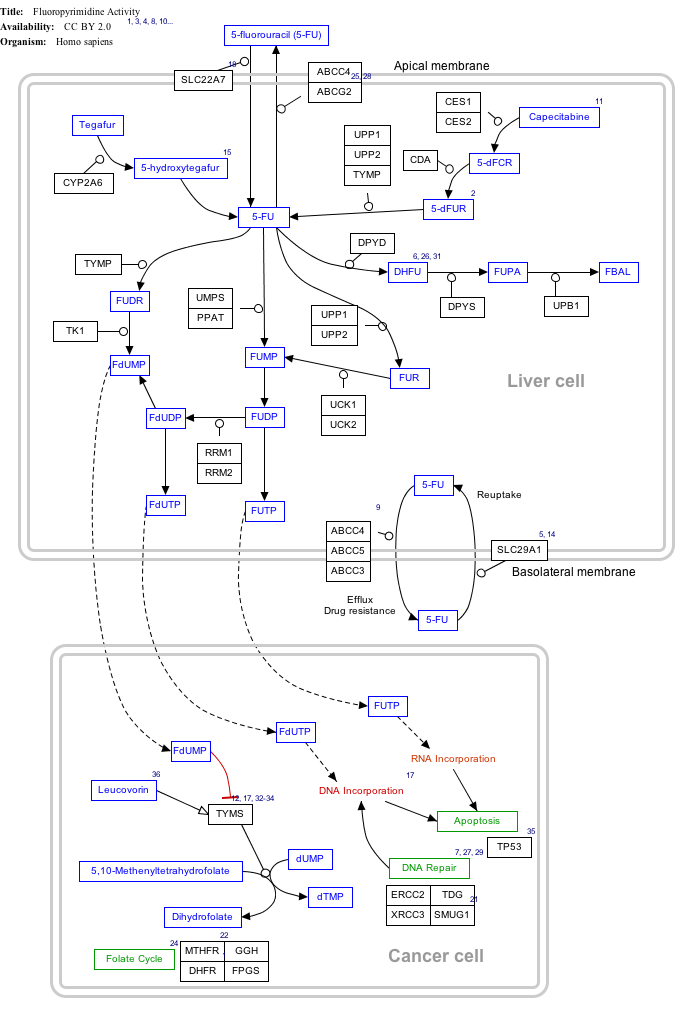

Fluorouracil (5-FU) Activity edit

== Distribution ==
CYP2A6 localizes to the endoplasmic reticulum and is found predominantly in the liver.

== Variability ==
Significant interindividual variability in CYP2A6 apoprotein and mRNA levels has been observed.

== Induction ==
CYP2A6 is known to be inducible by phenobarbital and rifampicin, and it is suspected that other antiepileptic drugs may also have this effect.

== CYP2A6 Ligands ==
Selected inducers, inhibitors and substrates of CYP2A6
Substrates	Inhibitors	Inducers
Many Carcinogens; MNAN; NNK; NDEA; MTBE; Other toxins; aflatoxin B_{1} (mycotoxin); 1,3-butadiene (in synthetic rubber); coumarin (anticoagulant, found in cinnamon); DCBN (herbicide); 7-ethoxycoumarin (test substrate); skatole; quinoline; MOCA (in polyurethane production); halothane (anaesthetic); losigamone (anticonvulsant); methoxyflurane (anaesthetic); cotinine (metabolite of nicotine); nicotine (stimulant); SM-12502 (PAF antagonist); valproic acid (anticonvulsant, mood-stabilizing); dexmedetomidine (sedative)	amiodarone (antiarrhythmic agent); amlodipine (calcium channel blocker); buprenorphine (semisynthetic opioid); clofibrate (fibrate); clotrimazole (antifungal); desipramine (tricyclic antidepressant); disulfiram (acetaldehyde dehydrogenase inhibitor); entacapone (COMT inhibitor, used in Parkinson's disease); fenofibrate (fibrate); gabapentin (anticonvulsant); grapefruit juice flavonoids; isoniazid (antibacterial); ketoconazole (antifungal); letrozole (aromatase inhibitor, used in breast cancer); methimazole (antithyroid agent); methoxsalen (furanocoumarin, used in psoriasis); metyrapone (used to diagnose adrenal insufficiency); miconazole (antifungal); modafinil (wakefulness-promoting agent); nicotine (stimulant); orphenadrine (antihistamine); pilocarpine (muscarinic receptor agonist); pregabalin (anticonvulsant); selegiline (monoamine oxidase inhibitor); sulconazole (antifungal); tioconazole (antifungal); tranylcypromine (monoamine oxidase inhibitor)	Barbiturates; amobarbital; pentobarbital; phenobarbital; secobarbital; rifampicin (antibacterial)

== See also ==
- List of cytochrome P450 modulators
