= Pyrimidone =

2-Pyrimidone
4-Pyrimidone

Names
- Preferred IUPAC name 1H-Pyrimidin-6-one
- Other names Hydroxypyrimidine; Pyrimidinone

Identifiers
CAS Number	557-01-7 2-Pyrimidone; 4562-27-0 4-Pyrimidone
3D model (JSmol)	Interactive image
ChemSpider	61686 2-Pyrimidone; 19489 4-Pyrimidone
PubChem CID	20695
UNII	13K708ILY4 2-Pyrimidone; K43V90OY4L 4-Pyrimidone
- InChI: InChI=1S/C4H4N2O/c7-4-1-2-5-3-6-4/h1-3H,(H,5,6,7) Key: DNCYBUMDUBHIJZ-UHFFFAOYSA-N
- SMILES: O=C1NC=NC=C1

Properties
Chemical formula	C_{4}H_{4}N_{2}O
Molar mass	96.089 g·mol^{−1}
Appearance	White to light yellow powder
Melting point	163 to 168 °C (325 to 334 °F; 436 to 441 K)

Hazards
- Occupational safety and health (OHS/OSH)
Main hazards	Respiratory system, eye, skin irritation
- Except where otherwise noted, data are given for materials in their standard state (at 25 °C [77 °F], 100 kPa). verify (what is ?) Infobox references

Pyrimidone is the name given to either of two heterocyclic compounds with the formula C_{4}H_{4}N_{2}O: 2-pyrimidone and 4-pyrimidone. The compounds can also be called 2-hydroxypyrimidine or 4-hydroxypyrimidine respectively, based on a substituted pyrimidine, or 1,3-diazine, ring.

== Derivatives ==
Derivatives of pyrimidone are the basis of many other biological molecules, including:

- Nucleobases, such as cytosine
- Barbiturates, such as metharbital
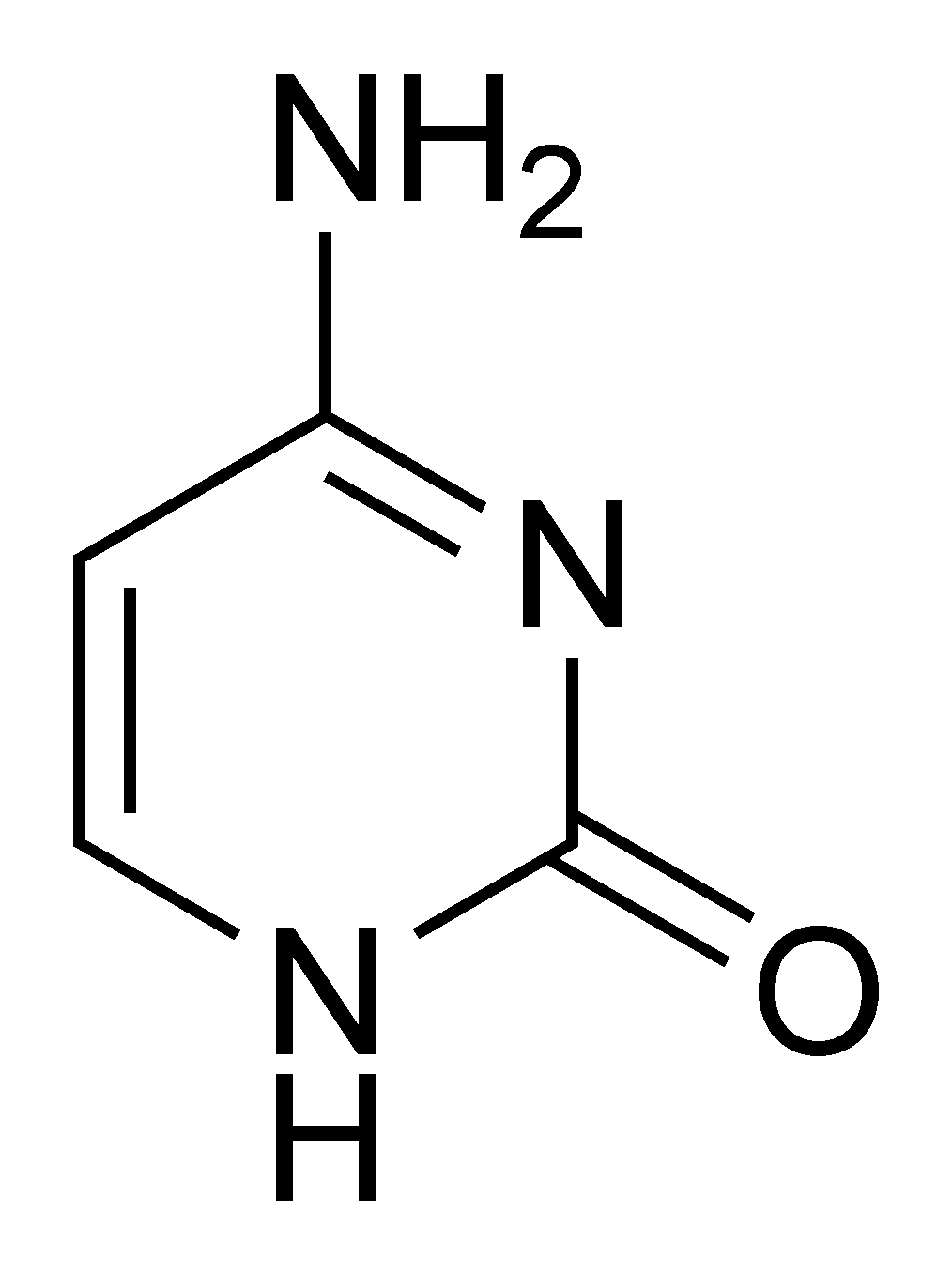
Cytosine

Metharbital

Pyrimidone-derived antiulcer drugs include temelastine, icotidine, donetidine, and lupitidine.

Methylated pyrimidone derivatives undergo pH-switched photoisomerization to the corresponding Dewar arene. The process can be used for long-term thermal energy storage with an energy density of 1.6 MJ/kg, approximately double that of a lithium ion battery.
