= Streptomyces lucensis =

Scientific classification
- Domain: Bacteria
- Kingdom: Bacillati
- Phylum: Actinomycetota
- Class: Actinomycetia
- Order: Streptomycetales
- Family: Streptomycetaceae
- Genus: Streptomyces
- Species: S. lucensis

Binomial name
- Streptomyces lucensis Arcamone et al. 1957

Type strain
- 1163 FI, AS 4.1855, AS 4.2004, ATCC 17804, ATCC 25468, BCRC 15141, CBS 701.69, CCRC 15141, CGMCC 4.1855, CGMCC 4.2004, DSM 40317, IFO 13056, IMRU 3783, ISP 5317, JCM 4490, KCC S-0490, KCCS-0490, LMG 20065, NBRC 13056, NCIMB 12679, NRRL B-16066, NRRL B-5626, NRRL B-B-16066, NRRL-ISP 5317, RIA 1248, VKM Ac-1737, Waksman 3783

Species of bacterium

Streptomyces lucensis is a bacterium species from the genus of Streptomyces which has been isolated from soil. Streptomyces lucensis produces lucensomycin A, lucensomycin B, lucensomycin D, lucensomycin E, lucensomycin F and lucensomycin G.

== See also ==
- List of Streptomyces species
