= Lodenosine =

Names
- IUPAC name [(2S,4S,5R)-5-(6-Amino-9H-purin-9-yl)-4-fluorooxolan-2-yl]methanol

Identifiers
CAS Number	110143-10-7
3D model (JSmol)	Interactive image
ChEMBL	ChEMBL501916
ChemSpider	65151
KEGG	D04759
PubChem CID	72180
UNII	3WB2LGT4R1
CompTox Dashboard (EPA)	DTXSID90149154
- InChI: InChI=1S/C10H12FN5O2/c11-6-1-5(2-17)18-10(6)16-4-15-7-8(12)13-3-14-9(7)16/h3-6,10,17H,1-2H2,(H2,12,13,14)/t5-,6-,10+/m0/s1 Key: KBEMFSMODRNJHE-JFWOZONXSA-N; InChI=1/C10H12FN5O2/c11-6-1-5(2-17)18-10(6)16-4-15-7-8(12)13-3-14-9(7)16/h3-6,10,17H,1-2H2,(H2,12,13,14)/t5-,6-,10+/m0/s1 Key: KBEMFSMODRNJHE-JFWOZONXBK
- SMILES: F[C@H]3C[C@H](O[C@H]3n2cnc1c(ncnc12)N)CO

Properties
Chemical formula	C_{10}H_{12}FN_{5}O_{2}
Molar mass	253.23 g/mol
- Except where otherwise noted, data are given for materials in their standard state (at 25 °C [77 °F], 100 kPa). verify (what is ?) Infobox references

Lodenosine is a failed experimental agent for the treatment of HIV. Its development was discontinued on January 11, 2001.
