= Levolet =

Levolet may refer to:

- Levothyroxine, a thyroid hormone
- Levofloxacin, a fluoroquinolone antibiotic
