= Pyrimidine =

Aromatic compound (C4H4N2)

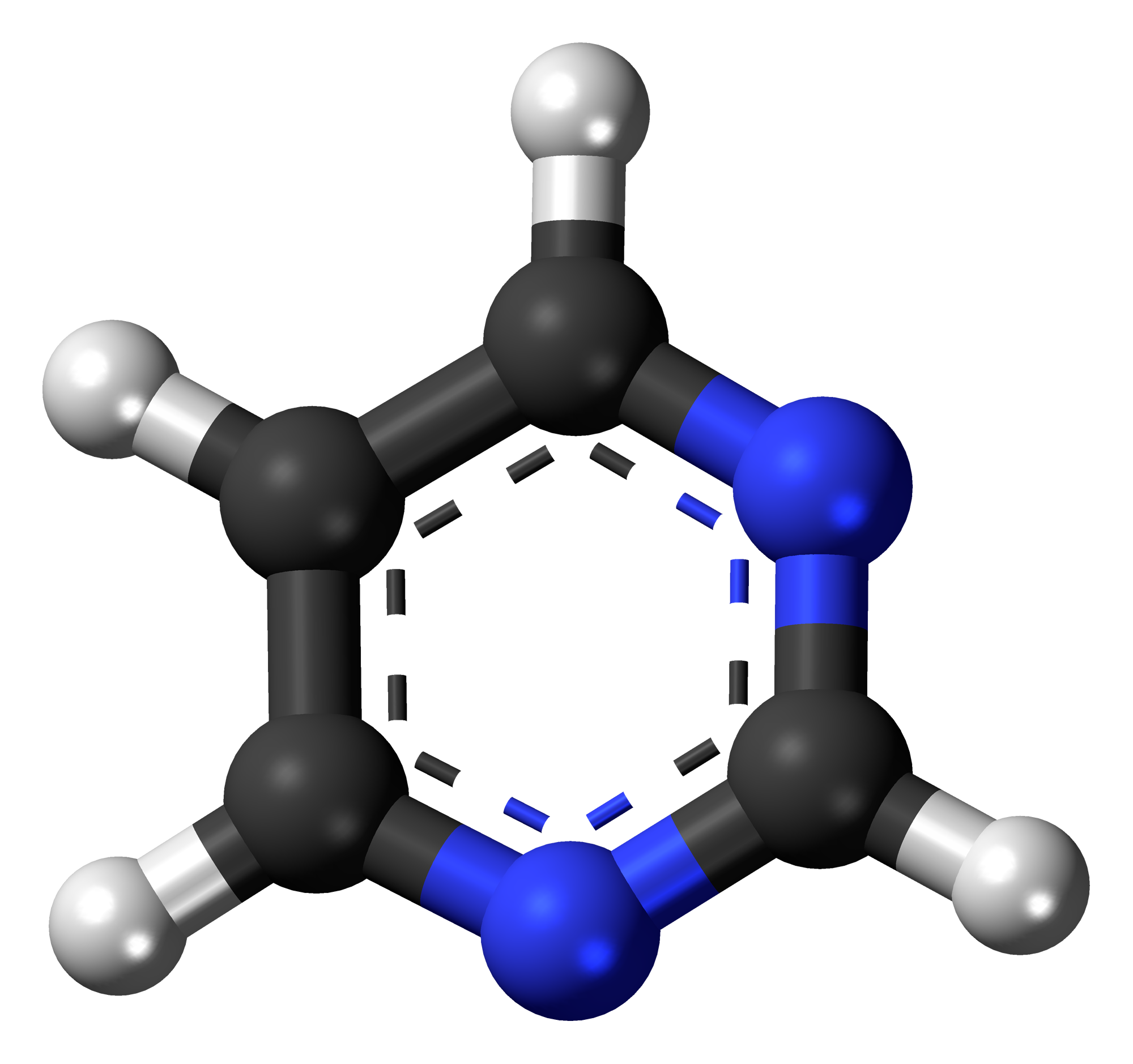

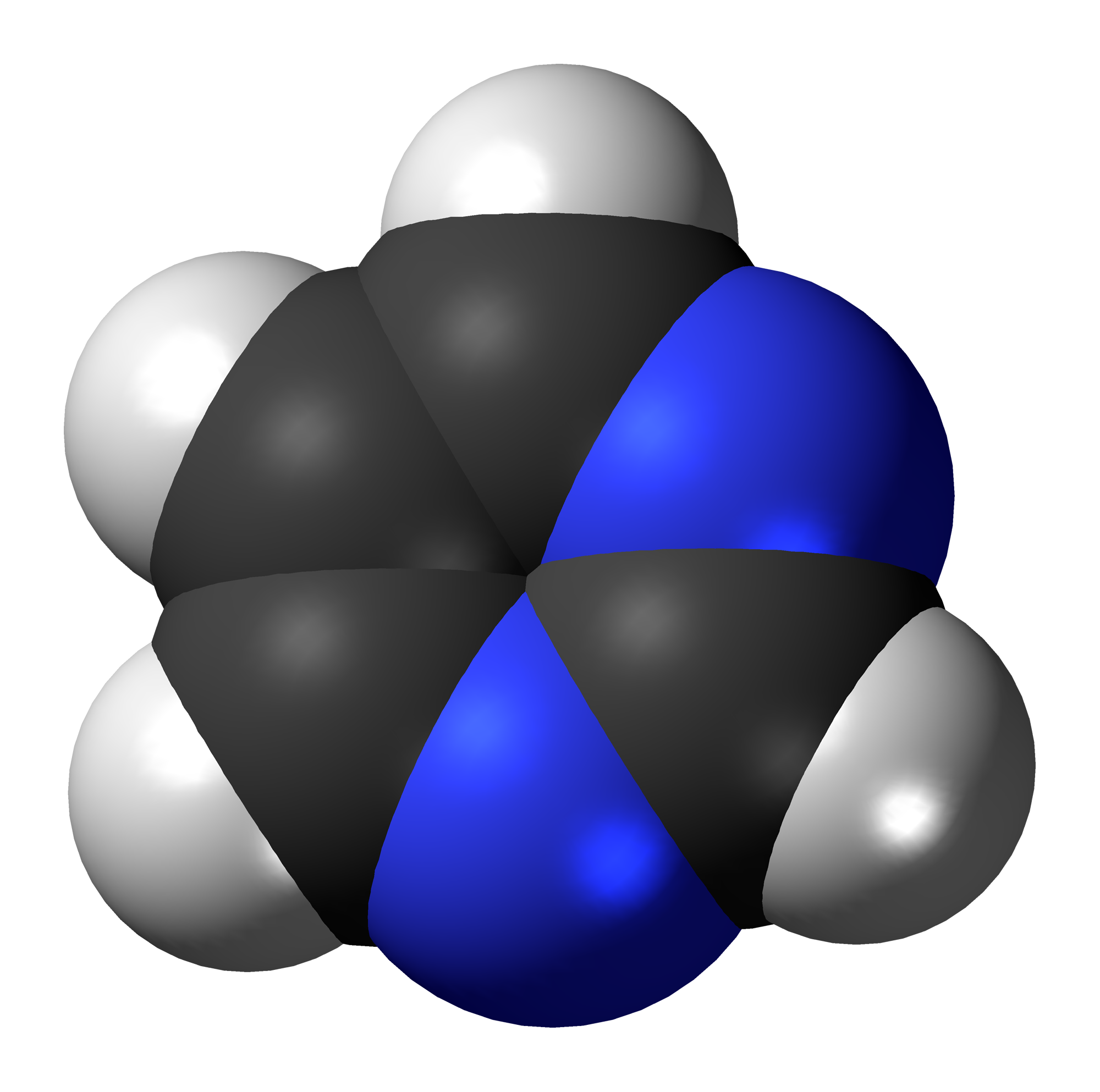

Names
- Preferred IUPAC name Pyrimidine
- Systematic IUPAC name 1,3-Diazabenzene
- Other names 1,3-Diazine m-Diazine

Identifiers
CAS Number	289-95-2
3D model (JSmol)	Interactive image
Beilstein Reference	103894
ChEBI	CHEBI:16898
ChEMBL	ChEMBL15562
ChemSpider	8903
ECHA InfoCard	100.005.479
EC Number	206-026-0
Gmelin Reference	49324
KEGG	C00396
MeSH	pyrimidine
PubChem CID	9260
UNII	K8CXK5Q32L
CompTox Dashboard (EPA)	DTXSID1051228
- InChI: InChI=1S/C4H4N2/c1-2-5-4-6-3-1/h1-4H Key: CZPWVGJYEJSRLH-UHFFFAOYSA-N; InChI=1/C4H4N2/c1-2-5-4-6-3-1/h1-4H Key: CZPWVGJYEJSRLH-UHFFFAOYAT
- SMILES: n1cnccc1

Properties
Chemical formula	C_{4}H_{4}N_{2}
Molar mass	80.088 g mol^{−1}
Density	1.016 g cm^{−3}
Melting point	20 to 22 °C (68 to 72 °F; 293 to 295 K)
Boiling point	123 to 124 °C (253 to 255 °F; 396 to 397 K)
Solubility in water	Miscible (25°C)
Acidity (pK_{a})	1.10 (protonated pyrimidine)

Hazards
- GHS labelling
Pictograms	(GHS02: Flammable) (GHS05: Corrosive)
Signal word	Danger
Hazard statements	H226, H318
Precautionary statements	P210, P233, P240, P241, P242, P243, P264+P265, P280, P303+P361+P353, P305+P354+P338, P317, P370+P378, P403+P235, P501
- Except where otherwise noted, data are given for materials in their standard state (at 25 °C [77 °F], 100 kPa). verify (what is ?) Infobox references

Pyrimidine (C_{4}H_{4}N_{2}; /pɪˈrɪ.mɪˌdiːn, paɪˈrɪ.mɪˌdiːn/) is a heterocyclic, aromatic, organic compound similar to pyridine (C_{5}H_{5}N). One of the three diazines (six-membered heterocyclics with two nitrogen atoms in the ring), it has nitrogen atoms at positions 1 and 3 in the ring. The other diazines are pyrazine (nitrogen atoms at the 1 and 4 positions) and pyridazine (nitrogen atoms at the 1 and 2 positions).

In nucleic acids, three types of nucleobases are pyrimidine derivatives: cytosine (C), thymine (T), and uracil (U).

Pyrimidine is also found in meteorites, but scientists still do not know its origin.

== Occurrence and history ==
Pinner's 1885 structure for pyrimidine

The pyrimidine ring system has wide occurrence in nature as substituted and ring fused compounds and derivatives, including the nucleotides cytosine, thymine and uracil, thiamine (vitamin B1) and alloxan. It is also found in many synthetic compounds such as barbiturates and the HIV drug zidovudine. Although pyrimidine derivatives such as alloxan were known in the early 19th century, a laboratory synthesis of a pyrimidine was not carried out until 1879, when Grimaux reported the preparation of barbituric acid from urea and malonic acid in the presence of phosphorus oxychloride. The systematic study of pyrimidines began in 1884 with Pinner, who synthesized derivatives by condensing ethyl acetoacetate with amidines. Pinner first proposed the name “pyrimidin” in 1885. The parent compound was first prepared by Gabriel and Colman in 1900, by conversion of barbituric acid to 2,4,6-trichloropyrimidine followed by reduction using zinc dust in hot water.

== Nomenclature ==
The nomenclature of pyrimidines is straightforward. However, like other heterocyclics, tautomeric hydroxyl groups yield complications since they exist primarily in the cyclic amide form. For example, 2-hydroxypyrimidine is more properly named 2-pyrimidone. A partial list of trivial names of various pyrimidines exists.

== Physical properties ==
Physical properties are shown in the data box. A more extensive discussion, including spectra, can be found in Brown et al.

== Chemical properties ==
Per the classification by Albert, six-membered heterocycles can be described as π-deficient. Substitution by electronegative groups or additional nitrogen atoms in the ring significantly increase the π-deficiency. These effects also decrease the basicity.

In pyridine, the π-electron density is less than in benzene, and in pyrimidines, it is lesser still. Therefore, electrophilic aromatic substitution is more difficult while nucleophilic aromatic substitution is facilitated. An example of the last reaction type is the displacement of the amino group in 2-aminopyrimidine by chlorine and its reverse.

Electron lone pair availability (basicity) is decreased compared to pyridine. Compared to pyridine, N-alkylation and N-oxidation are more difficult. The pK_{a} value for protonated pyrimidine is 1.23 compared to 5.30 for pyridine. Protonation and other electrophilic additions will occur at only one nitrogen due to further deactivation by the second nitrogen. Mono-N-oxidation occurs by reaction with peracids.

The 2-, 4-, and 6- positions on the pyrimidine ring are electron deficient analogous to those in pyridine and nitro- and dinitrobenzene. But this reactivity has few examples. Amination and hydroxylation have been observed for substituted pyrimidines. Reactions with Grignard or alkyllithium reagents yield 4-alkyl- or 4-aryl pyrimidine after aromatization.

The 5-position is less electron deficient and substituents there are quite stable. Electrophilic substitution is relatively facile at the 5-position, including nitration and halogenation. Nitration, nitrosation, azo coupling, halogenation, sulfonation, formylation, hydroxymethylation, and aminomethylation have all been observed with substituted pyrimidines.

Reduction in resonance stabilization of pyrimidines may lead to addition and ring cleavage reactions rather than substitutions. One such manifestation is observed in the Dimroth rearrangement.

Free radical attack has been observed for pyrimidine and photochemical reactions have been observed for substituted pyrimidines. Pyrimidine can be hydrogenated to give tetrahydropyrimidine.

== Synthesis ==
Pyrimidine biosynthesis creates derivatives —like orotate, thymine, cytosine, and uracil— de novo from carbamoyl phosphate and aspartate.

As is often the case with parent heterocyclic ring systems, the synthesis of pyrimidine is not that common and is usually performed by removing functional groups from derivatives. Primary syntheses in quantity involving formamide have been reported.

As a class, pyrimidines are typically synthesized by the principal synthesis involving cyclization of β-dicarbonyl compounds with N–C–N compounds. Reaction of the former with amidines to give 2-substituted pyrimidines, with urea to give 2-pyrimidinones, and guanidines to give 2-aminopyrimidines are typical.

Pyrimidines can be prepared via the Biginelli reaction and other multicomponent reactions. Many other methods rely on condensation of carbonyls with diamines for instance the synthesis of 2-thio-6-methyluracil from thiourea and ethyl acetoacetate or the synthesis of 4-methylpyrimidine with 4,4-dimethoxy-2-butanone and formamide.

A novel method is by reaction of N-vinyl and N-aryl amides with carbonitriles under electrophilic activation of the amide with 2-chloro-pyridine and trifluoromethanesulfonic anhydride:

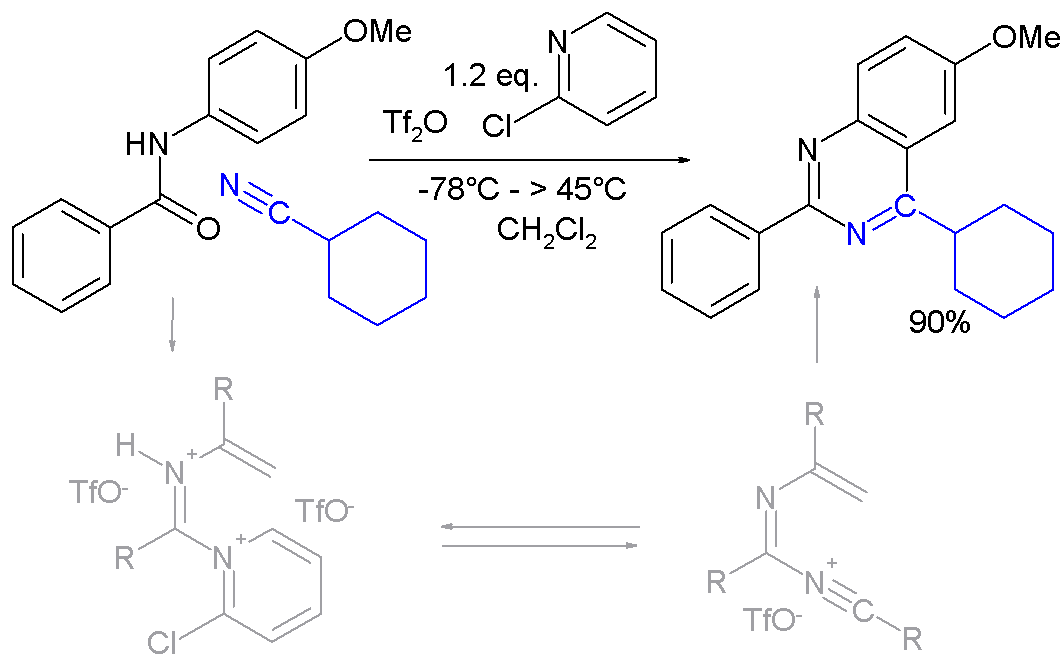

== Derivatives ==
Pyrimidine derivatives
Formula	Name	Structure	N1	N3	C2	C4	C5	C6
C_{4}H_{4}N_{2}O	2-Pyrimidone		-H		=O	-H	–H	–H
C_{4}H_{4}N_{2}O	4-Pyrimidone			–H	-H	=O	–H	–H
C_{4}H_{5}N_{3}O	cytosine		-H		=O	–NH_{2}	–H	–H
C_{4}H_{4}N_{2}O_{2}	uracil		-H	–H	=O	=O	–H	–H
C_{4}H_{3}FN_{2}O_{2}	fluorouracil		-H	–H	=O	=O	–F	–H
C_{5}H_{6}N_{2}O_{2}	thymine		-H	–H	=O	=O	–CH_{3}	–H
C_{4}H_{4}N_{2}O_{3}	barbituric acid		-H	–H	=O	=O	–H	=O
C_{5}H_{4}N_{2}O_{4}	orotic acid		-H	–H	=O	=O	–H	-COOH

=== Nucleotides ===
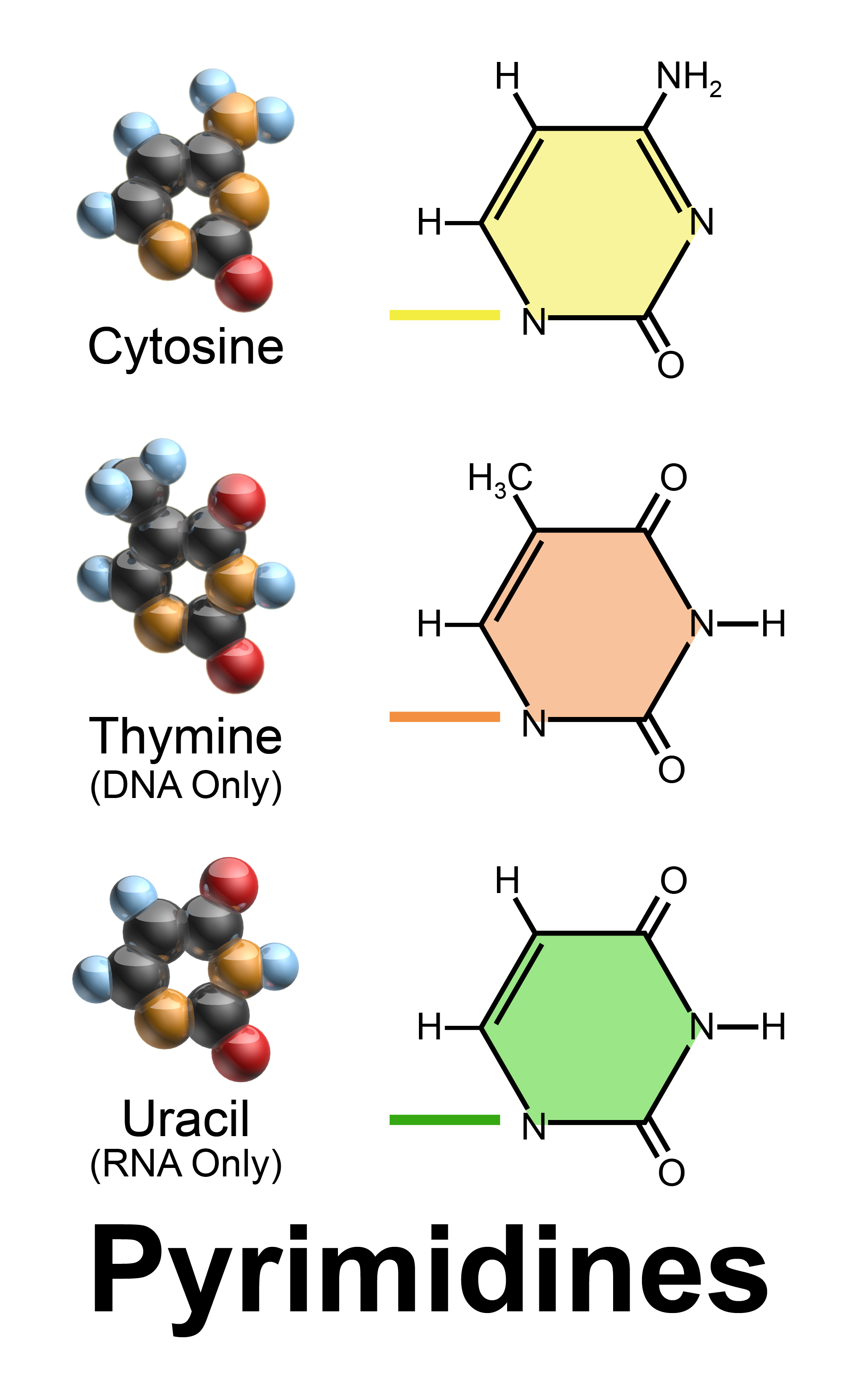
The pyrimidine nitrogen bases found in DNA and RNA.

Three nucleobases found in nucleic acids, cytosine (C), thymine (T), and uracil (U), are pyrimidine derivatives:

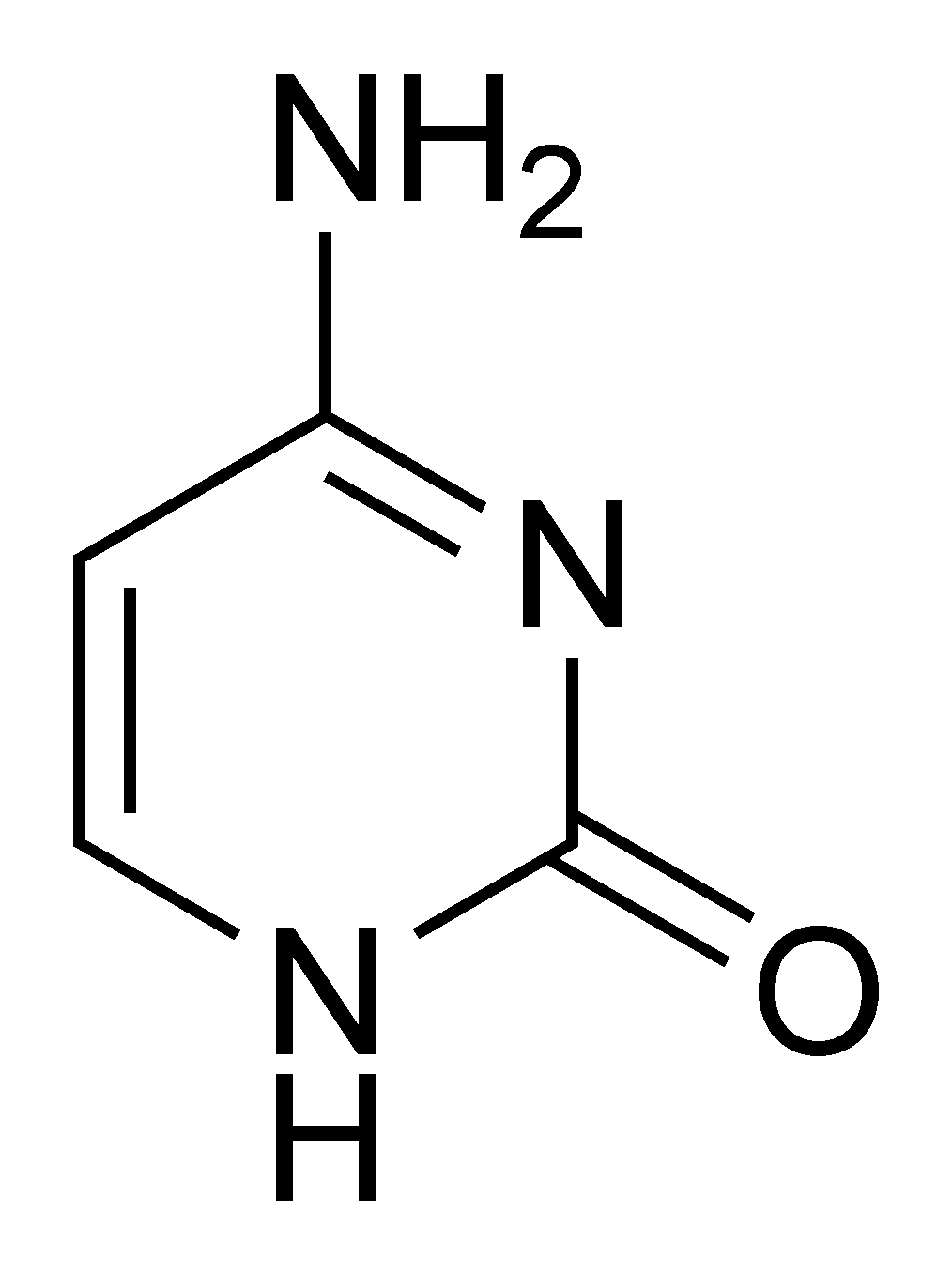
Chemical structure of cytosine

Cytosine (C)

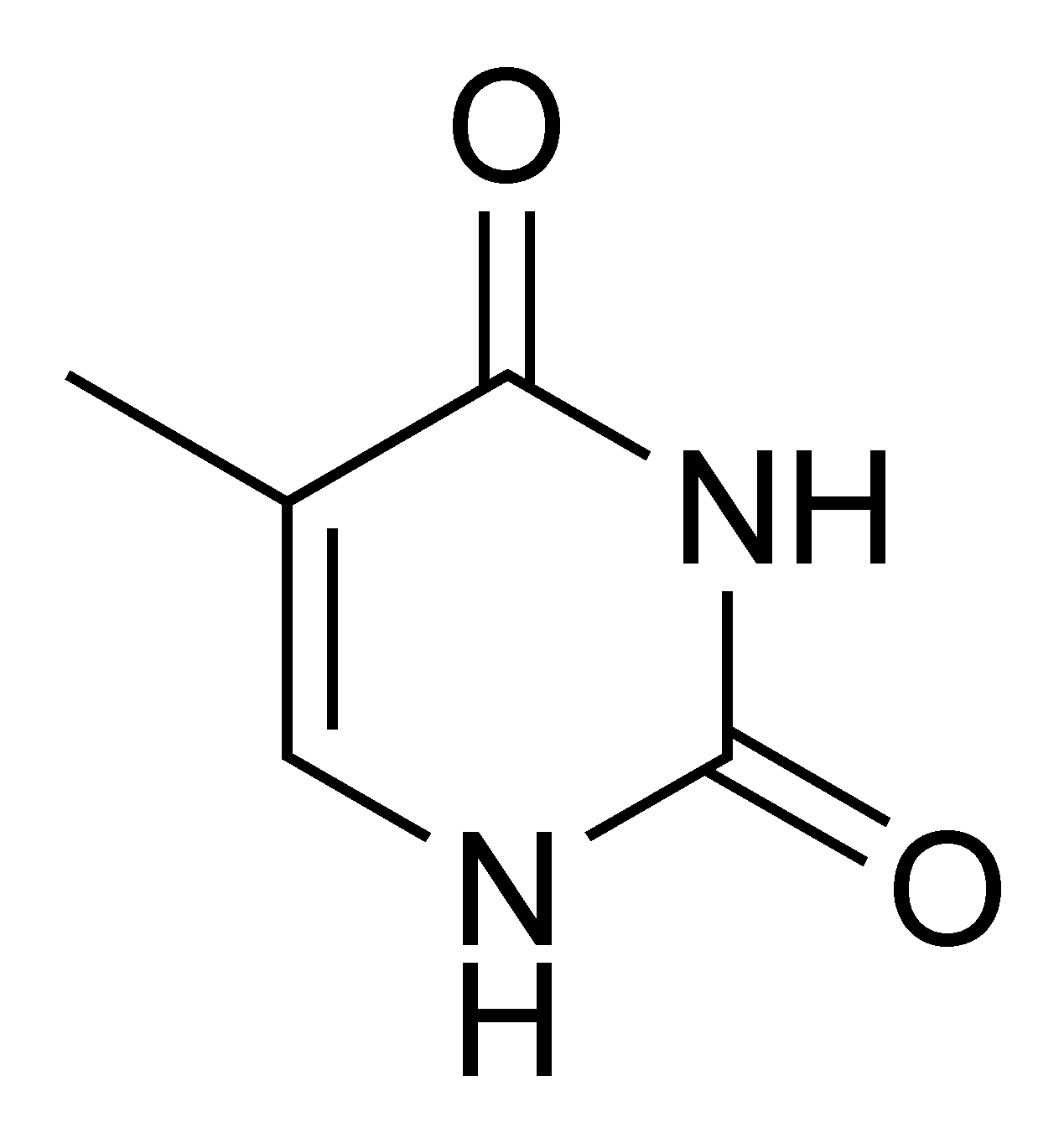
Chemical structure of thymine

Thymine (T)

Chemical structure of uracil

Uracil (U)

In DNA and RNA, these bases form hydrogen bonds with their complementary purines. Thus, in DNA, the purines adenine (A) and guanine (G) pair up with the pyrimidines thymine (T) and cytosine (C), respectively.

In RNA, the complement of adenine (A) is uracil (U) instead of thymine (T), so the pairs that form are adenine:uracil and guanine:cytosine.

Very rarely, thymine can appear in RNA, or uracil in DNA, but when the other three major pyrimidine bases are represented, some minor pyrimidine bases can also occur in nucleic acids. These minor pyrimidines are usually methylated versions of major ones and are postulated to have regulatory functions.

These hydrogen bonding modes are for classical Watson–Crick base pairing. Other hydrogen bonding modes ("wobble pairings") are available in both DNA and RNA, although the additional 2′-hydroxyl group of RNA expands the configurations, through which RNA can form hydrogen bonds.

== Theoretical aspects ==
In March 2015, NASA Ames scientists reported that, for the first time, complex DNA and RNA organic compounds of life, including uracil, cytosine and thymine, have been formed in the laboratory under outer space conditions, using starting chemicals, such as pyrimidine, found in meteorites. Pyrimidine, like polycyclic aromatic hydrocarbons (PAHs), the most carbon-rich chemical found in the universe, may have been formed in red giants or in interstellar dust and gas clouds.

Pyrimidine also photolytically decomposes into uracil under ultraviolet light.

=== Prebiotic synthesis of pyrimidine nucleotides ===
In order to understand how life arose, knowledge is required of the chemical pathways that permit formation of the key building blocks of life under plausible prebiotic conditions. The RNA world hypothesis holds that in the primordial soup there existed free-floating ribonucleotides, the fundamental molecules that combine in series to form RNA. Complex molecules such as RNA must have emerged from relatively small molecules whose reactivity was governed by physico-chemical processes. RNA is composed of pyrimidine and purine nucleotides, both of which are necessary for reliable information transfer, and thus natural selection and Darwinian evolution. Becker et al. showed how pyrimidine nucleosides can be synthesized from small molecules and ribose, driven solely by wet-dry cycles. Purine nucleosides can be synthesized by a similar pathway. 5’-mono-and diphosphates also form selectively from phosphate-containing minerals, allowing concurrent formation of polyribonucleotides with both the pyrimidine and purine bases. Thus a reaction network towards the pyrimidine and purine RNA building blocks can be established starting from simple atmospheric or volcanic molecules.

== See also ==
- ANRORC mechanism
- Purine
- Pyrimidine metabolism
- Simple aromatic rings
- Transition
- Transversion
