= Isosulfan blue =

Pharmaceutical drug

Clinical data
- Trade names: Lymphazurin
- Other names: Isosulfan blue inner salt
- AHFS/Drugs.com: Micromedex Detailed Consumer Information
- License data: US DailyMed: Isosulfan blue
- Routes of administration: Subcutaneous
- ATC code: None

Legal status
- Legal status: US: ℞-only

Identifiers
- CAS Number: 68238-36-8; inner salt: 748080-29-7
- PubChem CID: 50108; inner salt: 52946590
- DrugBank: DBSALT002720; inner salt: DB09136
- ChemSpider: 45452; inner salt: 4533
- UNII: 39N9K8S2A4; inner salt: NS6Q291771
- KEGG: D04634
- ChEMBL: ChEMBL1200859; inner salt: ChEMBL1615783
- CompTox Dashboard (EPA): DTXSID8057805
- ECHA InfoCard: 100.248.842

Chemical and physical data
- Formula: C_{27}H_{31}N_{2}NaO_{6}S_{2}
- Molar mass: 566.66 g·mol^{−1}
- 3D model (JSmol): Interactive image; inner salt: Interactive image
- SMILES: [Na+].CCN(CC)C1=CC=C(C=C1)C(=C1C=CC(C=C1)=[N+](CC)CC)C1=CC(=CC=C1S([O-])(=O)=O)S([O-])(=O)=O; inner salt: CCN(CC)c1ccc(cc1)C(=C2C=CC(=[N+](CC)CC)C=C2)c3cc(ccc3S(=O)(=O)[O-])S(=O)(=O)O
- InChI: InChI=1S/C27H32N2O6S2.Na/c1-5-28(6-2)22-13-9-20(10-14-22)27(21-11-15-23(16-12-21)29(7-3)8-4)25-19-24(36(30,31)32)17-18-26(25)37(33,34)35;/h9-19H,5-8H2,1-4H3,(H-,30,31,32,33,34,35);/q;+1/p-1; Key:NLUFDZBOHMOBOE-UHFFFAOYSA-M; inner salt: InChI=1S/C27H32N2O6S2/c1-5-28(6-2)22-13-9-20(10-14-22)27(21-11-15-23(16-12-21)29(7-3)8-4)25-19-24(36(30,31)32)17-18-26(25)37(33,34)35/h9-19H,5-8H2,1-4H3,(H-,30,31,32,33,34,35)/p+1; Key:YFKDCGWIINMRQY-UHFFFAOYSA-N

Isosulfan blue, sold under the brand name Lymphazurin among others, is a contrast agent medication used to delineate the lymphatic vessels during a lymphography procedure.
