= Linvoseltamab =

Medication

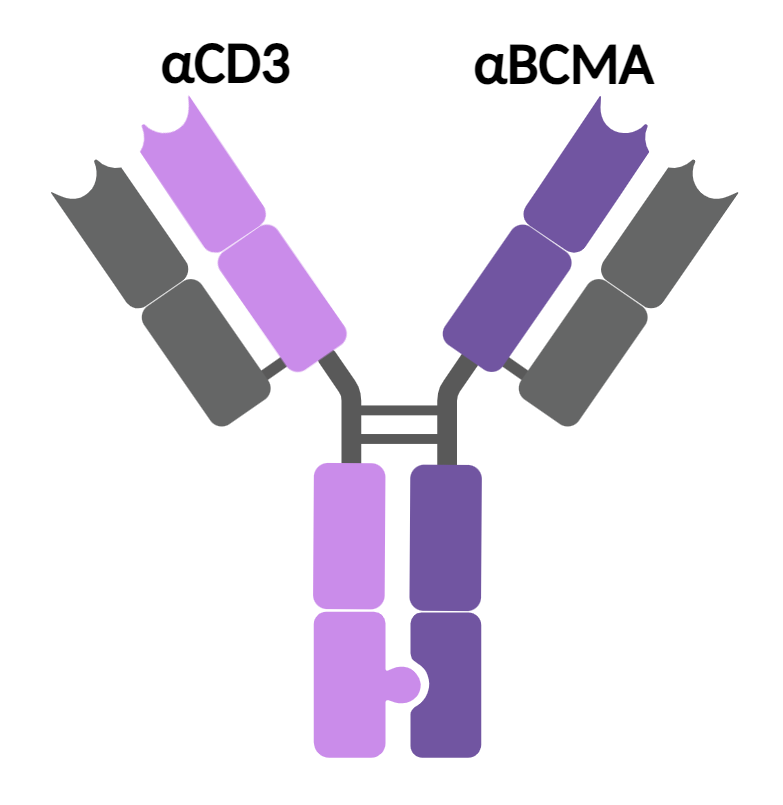

Monoclonal antibody
- Type: Whole antibody
- Source: Human
- Target: CD3 and BCMA

Clinical data
- Trade names: Lynozyfic
- Other names: REGN5458, REGN-5458, linvoseltamab-gcpt
- AHFS/Drugs.com: Monograph
- MedlinePlus: a625085
- License data: US DailyMed: Linvoseltamab
- Routes of administration: Intravenous
- ATC code: L01FX37 (WHO)

Legal status
- Legal status: US: ℞-only; EU: Rx-only

Identifiers
- CAS Number: 2408319-25-3
- DrugBank: DB17447
- UNII: M3CPC50MZS
- KEGG: D12222

Chemical and physical data
- Formula: C_{6455}H_{9955}N_{1721}O_{2039}S_{47}
- Molar mass: 145800.47 g·mol^{−1}

Linvoseltamab, sold under the brand name Lynozyfic, is an anti-cancer medication used for the treatment of people with relapsed or refractory multiple myeloma. Linvoseltamab is a bispecific monoclonal antibody that targets CD3 and B-cell maturation antigen (BCMA) (TNFRSF17). It is a bispecific B-cell maturation antigen (BCMA)-directed CD3 T-cell engager and a recombinant human immunoglobulin (Ig)G4 antibody.

Lynozyfic was authorized for medical use in the European Union in April 2025, and approved for medical use in the United States in July 2025.

== Medical uses ==
In the EU, linvoseltamab is indicated as monotherapy for the treatment of adults with relapsed or refractory multiple myeloma who have received at least three prior therapies, including a proteasome inhibitor, an immunomodulatory agent, and an anti-CD38 monoclonal antibody, and have demonstrated disease progression on the last therapy.

In the US, linvoseltamab is indicated for the treatment of adults with relapsed or refractory multiple myeloma who have received at least four prior lines of therapy, including a proteasome inhibitor, an immunomodulatory agent, and an anti-CD38 monoclonal antibody.

== Adverse effects ==
The US prescribing information for linvoseltamab includes a boxed warning for life-threatening cytokine release syndrome and neurologic toxicity, including immune effector cell-associated neurotoxicity.

== History ==
Efficacy was evaluated in LINKER-MM1 (NCT03761108), an open-label, multi-center multi-cohort trial. The trial included participants who had previously received at least three prior therapies, including a proteasome inhibitor, an immunomodulatory agent, and an anti-CD38 antibody. The trial excluded participants with prior BCMA-directed bispecific antibody therapy, prior bispecific T-cell engaging therapy, or prior BCMA CAR-T cell therapy. The efficacy population included 80 participants who had received at least 4 prior lines of therapy, including a proteasome inhibitor, an immunomodulatory agent, and an anti-CD38 monoclonal antibody.

== Society and culture ==
=== Legal status ===
In February 2025, the Committee for Medicinal Products for Human Use of the European Medicines Agency adopted a positive opinion, recommending the granting of a conditional marketing authorization for the medicinal product Lynozyfic, intended for the treatment of people with relapsed and refractory multiple myeloma who have received at least three prior therapies. The applicant for this medicinal product is Regeneron Ireland DAC. Lynozyfic was authorized for medical use in the European Union in April 2025.

In July 2025, linvoseltamab was approved for medical use in the United States. The US Food and Drug Administration (FDA) granted the application for linvoseltamab priority review, orphan drug, and fast track designations.

=== Names ===
Linvoseltamab is the international nonproprietary name.

Linvoseltamab is sold under the brand name Lynozyfic.
