= Leconotide =

Conotoxin peptide under investigation as an analgesic drug

Clinical data
- Routes of administration: IV
- ATC code: None

Identifiers
- CAS Number: 247207-64-3
- PubChem CID: 16132255
- ChemSpider: 17288914
- UNII: 2P1P5JB93S
- CompTox Dashboard (EPA): DTXSID30179455

Chemical and physical data
- Formula: C_{107}H_{179}N_{35}O_{36}S_{7}
- Molar mass: 2756.24 g·mol^{−1}

Leconotide (INN; development codes CNSB004 and AM336; also known as ω-conotoxin CVID) is an ω-conotoxin peptide isolated from the venom of Conus catus which is under investigation as an analgesic drug for the treatment of pain conditions.

It acts as an N-type voltage-gated calcium channel (Ca_{v}2.2) blocker and is highly selective for this channel over the related P/Q-type voltage-gated calcium channel (Ca_{v}2.1).

Relative to ziconotide, leconotide is advantageous in that it is significantly less toxic, and for that reason can be administered intravenously as opposed to via intrathecal injection.

== See also ==
- Ziconotide, an analgesic peptide derived from the toxin of the cone snail species Conus magus
- Lacosamide, an approved small molecule analgesic and anti-epileptic
- Ralfinamide, an investigational small molecule analgesic
