= Lucatumumab =

Monoclonal antibody

Monoclonal antibody
- Type: Whole antibody
- Source: Human
- Target: CD40

Clinical data
- ATC code: none

Identifiers
- CAS Number: 903512-50-5
- ChemSpider: none
- UNII: P0EP9VFC4R
- KEGG: D08942

Chemical and physical data
- Molar mass: 146 kg/mol

Lucatumumab (CHIR 12.12 or HCD122) is a human monoclonal antibody against CD40 development of which was discontinued by Novartis in 2013 after it was investigated for the treatment of various types of cancer like multiple myeloma and follicular lymphoma.

It is an antagonist to CD40 that was created by scientists at Chiron using Abgenix' XenoMouse transgenic mouse to generate fully human antibodies. It was made part of the collaboration between Chiron and Xoma that the companies commenced in 2004. Novartis took over the project when it acquired Chiron in 2005.

In in vitro studies, it inhibited cell proliferation induced by CD40 ligands and induced cell lysis.

Over three Phase 1 trials in multiple myeloma and chronic lymphocytic leukemia, the companies made an effort to determine the optimal dose, and obtained unclear results. The Phase I part of a planned Phase I/II trial in multiple myeloma was started in 2005, and in 2012 was updated to Phase II and closed; as of 2014 the results had not been published.
