= Lucimycin =

Identifiers
| CAS Number | 13058-67-8 |
| 3D model (JSmol) | Interactive image |
| ChemSpider | 21250887 |
| ECHA InfoCard | 100.032.667 |
| EC Number | 235-950-7 |
| PubChem CID | 6433568 |
| UNII | 3K1B4B63D0 |
- InChI: InChI=1S/C36H53NO13/c1-3-4-12-23-13-10-8-6-5-7-9-11-14-24(48-35-33(42)31(37)32(41)21(2)46-35)18-28-30(34(43)44)25(39)20-36(45,50-28)19-22(38)17-27-26(49-27)15-16-29(40)47-23/h5-11,14-16,21-28,30-33,35,38-39,41-42,45H,3-4,12-13,17-20,37H2,1-2H3,(H,43,44)/b6-5+,9-7+,10-8+,14-11+,16-15+/t21?,22?,23?,24?,25?,26?,27?,28?,30?,31?,32-,33?,35+,36?/m1/s1 Key: MUAOHYJGHYFDSA-LXLPNFJMSA-N
- SMILES: CCCCC1C/C=C/C=C/C=C/C=C/C(CC2C(C(CC(O2)(CC(CC3C(O3)/C=C/C(=O)O1)O)O)O)C(=O)O)O[C@H]4C(C([C@@H](C(O4)C)O)N)O

Properties
| Chemical formula | C_{36}H_{53}NO_{13} |
| Molar mass | 707.80492 |
- Except where otherwise noted, data are given for materials in their standard state (at 25 °C [77 °F], 100 kPa). verify (what is ?) Infobox references

Lucimycin (INN, also known as lucensomycin and etruscomycin) is a macrolide antibiotic synthesized by the bacterium Streptomyces lucensis. It belongs to the group of polyene antimycotics and was first isolated in the 1960s. It has seen only limited clinical use.

Lucimycin is also produced by the Streptomyces cyanogenus S136, where the full biosynthetic gene cluster for the production of this compound was described.
