= Libivirumab =

Monoclonal antibody

Monoclonal antibody
- Type: Whole antibody
- Source: Human
- Target: Hepatitis B surface antigen

Clinical data
- ATC code: none

Identifiers
- CAS Number: 569658-79-3
- ChemSpider: none
- UNII: J1R33H8X7A

Chemical and physical data
- Formula: C_{6598}H_{10232}N_{1788}O_{2060}S_{46}
- Molar mass: 149039.65 g·mol^{−1}

Libivirumab is a human monoclonal antibody directed against the hepatitis B virus.
