= Lasinavir =

Names
- Systematic IUPAC name tert-Butyl (3S,4S,6R,9S)-13-benzyl-12-hydroxy-6,9-dioxo-7-(propan-2-yl)-10-[(2,3,4-trimethoxyphenyl)methyl]-2-oxa-5,8,14-triazapentadecan-15-oate

Identifiers
| CAS Number | 175385-62-3 |
| 3D model (JSmol) | Interactive image |
| ChemSpider | 408297 |
| PubChem CID | 464372 |
| UNII | 0QGV8237I3 |
- InChI: InChI=1S/C35H53N3O9/c1-22(2)29(33(41)36-17-18-43-6)38-32(40)25(20-24-15-16-28(44-7)31(46-9)30(24)45-8)21-27(39)26(19-23-13-11-10-12-14-23)37-34(42)47-35(3,4)5/h10-16,22,25-27,29,39H,17-21H2,1-9H3,(H,36,41)(H,37,42)(H,38,40)/t25-,26+,27+,29+/m1/s1 Key: BEUUJDAEPJZWHM-COROXYKFSA-N
- SMILES: CC(C)[C@@H](C(=O)NCCOC)NC(=O)[C@H](CC1=C(C(=C(C=C1)OC)OC)OC)C[C@@H]([C@H](CC2=CC=CC=C2)NC(=O)OC(C)(C)C)O

Properties
| Chemical formula | C_{35}H_{53}N_{3}O_{9} |
| Molar mass | 659.81 g/mol |
- Except where otherwise noted, data are given for materials in their standard state (at 25 °C [77 °F], 100 kPa). (what is ?) Infobox references

Lasinavir (INN, previously known as BMS-234475 and CGP-61755) is an experimental peptidomimetic protease inhibitor researched by Novartis and Bristol-Myers Squibb as a treatment for HIV infection. It was originally discovered by Novartis at Basel (Switzerland). Its investigation was terminated after Phase I on October 09, 2002.
