= Lenampicillin =

Chemical compound

Clinical data
- Trade names: Takacillin, Varacillin
- Other names: KBT-1585

Legal status
- Legal status: Rx in Japan

Identifiers
- IUPAC name: (5-Methyl-2-oxo-1,3-dioxol-4-yl)methyl (2S,5R,6R)-6-[[(2R)-2-amino-2-phenylacetyl]amino]-3,3-dimethyl-7-oxo-4-thia-1-azabicyclo[3.2.0]heptane-2-carboxylate
- CAS Number: 86273-18-9
- PubChem CID: 65646
- UNII: 8M568DM08K
- CompTox Dashboard (EPA): DTXSID1057901

Chemical and physical data
- Formula: C_{21}H_{23}N_{3}O_{7}S
- Molar mass: 461.49 g·mol^{−1}

Lenampicillin is an antibiotic drug of the penicillin class. It is a prodrug of ampicillin; after oral administration of lenampicillin, ampicillin is rapidly formed.

Lenampicillin inhibits bacterial penicillin binding proteins (transpeptidase) and is effective against a wide range of bacterial infections.

Lenampicillin was developed in Japan and has been marketed there.
