= Neuvenge =

Therapeutic cancer vaccine in development

Neuvenge, Lapuleucel-T (APC 8024), is a therapeutic cancer vaccine (TCV) in development (clinical trial) by Dendreon (DNDN). It uses the "immunotherapy platform approach" first successfully demonstrated on the U.S. Food and Drug Administration (FDA)-approved TCV Provenge. It was first tested on breast cancer patients with tumors expressing HER2/neu, and is now scheduled to be tested on bladder cancer patients.

== History ==
The concept of immunotherapy for cancer has been known for hundreds of years and was used by Dr William Coley et al. in the 1800s. Coley's Toxins are still available outside of the US. The idea of harnessing the antigen presenting cells (APC)'s to recognize cancer and target tumor cells for apoptosis (cell death) by the CD8 (cytotoxic cells) is a common approach to cancer vaccine researchers. This 1997 example article describes targeting EGFR and other cell products and attaching their antigens to the CD64 receptor cells also using GM-CSF to grow more cells. The NIH calls this topic "Biological response modifiers (BRMs) occur naturally in the body and can be produced in the laboratory. BRMs alter the interaction between the body's immune defenses and cancer cells to boost, direct, or restore the body's ability to fight the disease." Immunocompromising diseases have caused many deaths in human history. An ongoing example is Kaposi's sarcoma (KS) caused by the Human herpesvirus 8 virus normally controlled by the body's immune system. KS is normally a rare disease but AIDS has made it all to commonplace. AIDS patients, whose immune system has been compromised, fall victim to serious opportunistic infections such as (TB) and KS. The movie "Philadelphia (film)" gives a dramatic representation of AIDS and KS. A good method of preventing some cancers is to stop the viruses that lead to them. This is known as prophylactic treatment. The current cancer prophylactic vaccines are for Hepatitis B virus (HBV), HPV (cervical cancer, vaginal, vulvar cancer, penile, anal cancer) and HPV-positive oropharyngeal cancer are all defenses utilizing immunotherapy against viruses that lead to cancer.

== Milestones ==
"A successful (TCV) is considered a milestone for cancer immunotherapy." The only approved TCVs, as of 2010, are Provenge in the US and Oncogene in Russia. DNDN's future will require a different skill set to manage the mass production of this first-of-a-kind product. There are 32,000+/yr deaths from prostate cancer (CaP) in the US and that is only those with metastatic CRPC. If most of these patients were to receive this product that would increase current 2,000 output 16X. When (If) the project is expanded to those whose CaP is still controlled by hormone therapy that number could easily quadruple for the US alone. Were this therapy to be used on ALL Prostate cancer patients as a monotherapy that's (120,000+/yr.in the US). If those who are still on hormone therapy the numbers are in the millions. There are currently 2,000,000+ CaP patients in the US. DNDN is busy building plants, which all require FDA approval, in Morris Plains, New Jersey, Atlanta, Georgia and (Los Angeles County, California area) Seal Beach, California (actually in Orange County, California) for large scale Provenge production. They are still seeking overseas partners for development offshore.

== Prospects ==
DNDN have stated that their therapy is not a one-hit wonder and they plan to "move forward one Provenge-like new cancer treatment every year". This will demonstrate that they really have an immunotherapy platform approach to cancer.

== Combinational therapy ==
Involves using:

- Primary care
  - surgery
  - radiation
- Adjuvant care
  - hormone deprevation for those cancers effected by sex steroids
  - chemotherapy
  - therapeutic vaccine therapy. Immunotherapy has added another tool or leg for Oncologist to fight cancer. This therapy could be a part of all the other therapies listed.

== Neuvenge history ==
Neuvenge is still in preliminary clinical trials and is evolving as of 2011. First Neuvenge trials were performed on patients with metastatic breast, ovarian or colorectal cancer that expressed HER-2 (HER2/neu). Some patients with stable disease after week 48 received an additional "booster" treatment using the identical protocol. Lapuleucel-T is an investigational active immunotherapy product consisting of autologous peripheral blood mononuclear cells, including antigen presenting cells, which are cultured ex vivo with BA7072, a recombinant fusion antigen consisting of portions of the intracellular and extracellular regions of HER-2/neu linked to granulocyte-macrophage colony-stimulating factor. In a change of course, DNDN is planning a bladder cancer clinical trial using Neuvenge to begin 2011. DNDN is also using ACI technology Active cellular immunotherapy "This is a therapeutic platform using the patient's own cells to simulate an immune response." These are two major candidates:

- Carbonic anhydrase IX (CA9) for kidney, colon, cervical cancers
- Carcinoembryonic antigen (CEA) for breast, lung and colon cancers
