= Linifanib =

Chemical compound

Clinical data
- ATC code: None

Legal status
- Legal status: Investigational

Identifiers
- IUPAC name: 1-[4-(3-amino-1H-indazol-4-yl)phenyl]-3-(2-fluoro-5-methylphenyl)urea
- CAS Number: 796967-16-3
- PubChem CID: 11485656
- IUPHAR/BPS: 5657
- ChemSpider: 9660475
- UNII: CO93X137CW
- KEGG: D09635
- ChEBI: CHEBI:91435
- ChEMBL: ChEMBL223360
- CompTox Dashboard (EPA): DTXSID40229834
- ECHA InfoCard: 100.206.772

Chemical and physical data
- Formula: C_{17}H_{15}FN_{5}O
- Molar mass: 324.339 g·mol^{−1}
- 3D model (JSmol): Interactive image
- SMILES: Cc1ccc(F)c(NC(=O)Nc2ccc(-c3cccc4[nH]nc(N)c34)cc2)c1
- InChI: InChI=1S/C21H18FN5O/c1-12-5-10-16(22)18(11-12)25-21(28)24-14-8-6-13(7-9-14)15-3-2-4-17-19(15)20(23)27-26-17/h2-11H,1H3,(H3,23,26,27)(H2,24,25,28); Key:MPVGZUGXCQEXTM-UHFFFAOYSA-N

Linifanib (ABT-869) is a structurally novel, potent inhibitor of receptor tyrosine kinases (RTK), vascular endothelial growth factor (VEGF) and platelet-derived growth factor (PDGF) with IC_{50} of 0.2, 2, 4, and 7 nM for human endothelial cells, PDGF receptor beta (PDGFR-β), KDR, and colony stimulating factor 1 receptor (CSF-1R), respectively. It has much less activity (IC50s > 1 μM) against unrelated RTKs, soluble tyrosine kinases, or serine/threonine kinases. In vivo linifanib is effective orally in mechanism-based murine models of VEGF-induced uterine edema (ED50 = 0.5 mg/kg) and corneal angiogenesis (>50%inhibition, 15 mg/kg).

The substance has been used as part of a chemical cocktail to turn old and senescent human cells back into young ones (as measured by transcriptomic age), without turning them all the way back into undifferentiated stem cells.
