= Lintuzumab =

Chemical compound

Monoclonal antibody
- Type: Whole antibody
- Source: Humanized (from mouse)
- Target: CD33

Clinical data
- ATC code: none

Identifiers
- CAS Number: 166089-32-3
- ChemSpider: none
- UNII: V00Y10W60W

Lintuzumab (SGN-33) is a humanized monoclonal antibody used in the treatment of cancer. The drug had been developed by Seattle Genetics as a treatment for acute myeloid leukemia (AML), a condition which results in the deaths of 9,000 people a year in the United States. Lintuzumab targets the CD33 protein, which is expressed in AML and other myeloproliferative diseases, but does not appear in abundance on normal cells.

Trials for AML were abandoned in 2010 when a phase IIb trial failed to show increased survival.

As of 2010, Seattle Genetics was conducting Phase II trials of lintuzumab in conjunction with bortezomib (marketed as Velcade) as a treatment for those with myelodysplastic syndromes.

== History of AML trials ==
Lintuzumab had been in mid-stage clinical trial when Seattle Genetics pulled the drug in September 2010 after evidence showed that it did not lead to higher survival rates. The U.S. Food and Drug Administration and the European Medicines Agency had granted lintuzumab orphan drug status for treatment of AML and myelodysplastic syndromes. Seattle Genetics had licensed lintuzumab from PDL BioPharma, which had been unsuccessful in treating AML in clinical trials of its own in which they used lower doses.

The Phase IIb randomized, double-blind clinical trial studied 211 individuals ages 60 and over who had been enrolled by February 2009 and who were poor candidates for high-dose chemotherapy or had made the choice to reject the traditional chemotherapy treatment. The study participants typically had a projected four to five months to live, with half treated with lintuzumab and a low dose of the chemotherapeutic agent cytarabine, while the other half were given cytarabine in combination with a placebo. No patients were harmed in the trial and patients in both groups lived longer than expected, with those being given lintuzumab having a lower death rate. However, the study found that there was no benefit to patients on a statistical basis, and that it did not reduce the risk of infection or the need for blood transfusions.

== Competition ==
Gemtuzumab ozogamicin (marketed as Mylotarg), a similar drug from Pfizer that also targets the CD33 protein on leukemic cells, was withdrawn from the market in June 2010 after trials showed little benefit to patients.

Clofarabine, a treatment for AML marketed by Genzyme as Clolar that targets a different treatment approach, failed to get approval from the FDA in October 2009, which said that additional trials were needed.

== Sources ==
- Feldman EJ, Brandwein J, Stone R, Kalaycio M, Moore J, O'Connor J, et al. (June 2005). "Phase III randomized multicenter study of a humanized anti-CD33 monoclonal antibody, lintuzumab, in combination with chemotherapy, versus chemotherapy alone in patients with refractory or first-relapsed acute myeloid leukemia". Journal of Clinical Oncology. 23 (18): 4110–6. doi:10.1200/JCO.2005.09.133. PMID 15961759.
