= Dodecanenitrile =

Names
- IUPAC name Dodecanenitrile
- Other names: Lauric nitrile; Lauronitrile

Identifiers
| CAS Number | 2437-25-4 |
| 3D model (JSmol) | Interactive image |
| ChEBI | CHEBI:189391 |
| ChEMBL | ChEMBL1879602 |
| ChemSpider | 16177 |
| ECHA InfoCard | 100.017.673 |
| EC Number | 219-440-1 |
| PubChem CID | 17092 |
| UNII | TL45I6761P |
| CompTox Dashboard (EPA) | DTXSID1022188 |
- InChI: InChI=1S/C12H23N/c1-2-3-4-5-6-7-8-9-10-11-12-13/h2-11H2,1H3 Key: VXCUURYYWGCLIH-UHFFFAOYSA-N
- SMILES: CCCCCCCCCCCC#N

Properties
| Chemical formula | C_{12}H_{23}N |
| Molar mass | 181.323 g·mol^{−1} |
| Density | 0.8240 g/cm^{3} |
| Melting point | 4 °C (39 °F; 277 K) |
| Boiling point | 277 °C (531 °F; 550 K) |
| Solubility in water | insoluble |
| Solubility | freely soluble in ethanol, diethyl ether, acetone, benzene, chloroform |
| Refractive index (n_{D}) | 1.436 (20 °C) |

Hazards
- GHS labelling
| Pictograms | (GHS07: Exclamation mark) (GHS09: Environmental hazard) |
| Signal word | Warning |
| Hazard statements | H315, H410 |
| Precautionary statements | P264, P273, P280, P302+P352, P321, P332+P317, P362+P364, P391, P501 |
- Except where otherwise noted, data are given for materials in their standard state (at 25 °C [77 °F], 100 kPa). Infobox references

Dodecanenitrile is an organic compound from the group of nitriles.

== Properties ==
Dodecanenitrile is a colorless, very low-flammability liquid that is practically insoluble in water. It is described as having a citrus odor with a "dry orange peel note."

== Usage ==
Dodecanenitrile is used as an intermediate for chemical syntheses and as a fragrance.

== Reactions ==
Dodecanenitrile can be reduced by the Stephen reduction with stannous chloride solution that is saturated with anhydrous hydrochloric acid, yielding the corresponding aldehyde, dodecanal.
