= Lurosetron =

Chemical compound

Clinical data
- ATC code: none

Identifiers
- IUPAC name: 6-fluoro-5-methyl-2-[(5-methyl-1H-imidazol-4-yl)methyl]-2,3,4,5-tetrahydro-1H-pyrido[4,3-b]indol-1-one
- CAS Number: 128486-54-4 143486-90-2 (mesylate)
- PubChem CID: 172999
- ChemSpider: 151068
- UNII: G694G740ZP
- KEGG: D04821
- CompTox Dashboard (EPA): DTXSID80162438

Chemical and physical data
- Formula: C_{17}H_{17}FN_{4}O
- Molar mass: 312.348 g·mol^{−1}
- 3D model (JSmol): Interactive image
- SMILES: CC1=C(N=CN1)CN2CCC3=C(C2=O)C4=C(N3C)C(=CC=C4)F
- InChI: InChI=1S/C17H17FN4O/c1-10-13(20-9-19-10)8-22-7-6-14-15(17(22)23)11-4-3-5-12(18)16(11)21(14)2/h3-5,9H,6-8H2,1-2H3,(H,19,20); Key:NUMKWGDDRWJQMY-UHFFFAOYSA-N

Lurosetron (INN) is a serotonin 5-HT_{3} receptor antagonist.

== Synthesis ==
Lurosetron synthesis
