= Lomerizine =

Chemical compound

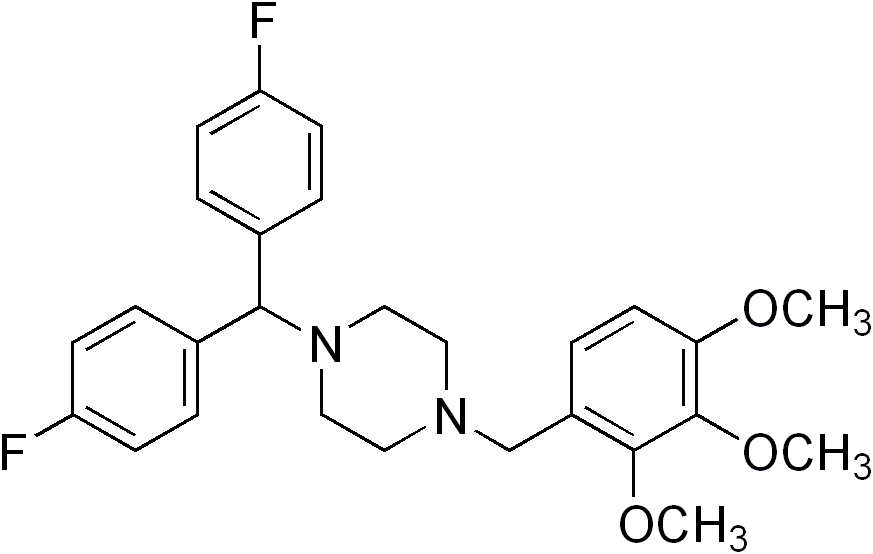

Clinical data
- Trade names: Migsis
- Other names: KB-2796
- AHFS/Drugs.com: International Drug Names
- Routes of administration: Oral
- ATC code: none

Legal status
- Legal status: In general: ℞ (Prescription only)

Identifiers
- IUPAC name: 1-[bis(4-fluorophenyl)methyl]-4-(2,3,4-trimethoxybenzyl)piperazine
- CAS Number: 101477-55-8
- PubChem CID: 3949
- DrugBank: DB14065
- ChemSpider: 3812
- UNII: DEE37CY4VO
- ChEBI: CHEBI:94682
- ChEMBL: ChEMBL29188
- CompTox Dashboard (EPA): DTXSID6048387

Chemical and physical data
- Formula: C_{27}H_{30}F_{2}N_{2}O_{3}
- Molar mass: 468.545 g·mol^{−1}
- 3D model (JSmol): Interactive image
- SMILES: COC1=C(C(=C(C=C1)CN2CCN(CC2)C(C3=CC=C(C=C3)F)C4=CC=C(C=C4)F)OC)OC
- InChI: InChI=1S/C27H30F2N2O3/c1-32-24-13-8-21(26(33-2)27(24)34-3)18-30-14-16-31(17-15-30)25(19-4-9-22(28)10-5-19)20-6-11-23(29)12-7-20/h4-13,25H,14-18H2,1-3H3; Key:JQSAYKKFZOSZGJ-UHFFFAOYSA-N

Lomerizine (INN; trade name Migsis) is a diphenylpiperazine class L-type and T-type calcium channel blocker. This drug is currently used clinically for the treatment of migraines, while also being used experimentally for the treatment of glaucoma and optic nerve injury.

== Solubility ==
Due to its lipophilic nature and small molecular size, lomerizine is able to cross the blood brain barrier. For delivery in aqueous systems, nanoparticle therapy may be used. Along with lipids, lomerizine is soluble in chloroform, methanol, and DMSO.

== Mechanism of action ==
Lomerizine works as a calcium antagonist by blocking voltage-dependent calcium channels. A study using [^{3}H]Nitrendipine showed that lomerizine allosterically inhibits binding in calcium channels at a different site from the 1,4 dihydropyridine binding site. However, its antimigraine effects are believed to be due not to the blocking of calcium channels, but to the antagonizing effects of lomerizine on the 5HT_{2A} receptor. The drug was shown to competitively inhibit binding of [^{3}H]spiperone to 5-HT_{2A} receptors, inhibiting the 5-HT driven release of Ca^{2+}. Lomerizine treatment of 5-HT_{2A} expressing cells led to the inhibition of Ca^{2+} release in response to 5-HT, while Ca^{2+} release in response to ATP was unaffected. By preventing the release of Ca^{2+}, lomerizine prevents serotonin-induced contraction of the basilar artery, which can lead to migraines.

Lomerizine has also been shown to possess neuroprotective effects, specifically in the case of retinal damage. Doses of .03 mg/kg given intravenously as a pretreatment were shown to prevent glutamate-induced neurotoxicity, while also providing protection against NMDA-induced and kainate-induced neurotoxicity. Lomerizine was shown to have little affinity for NMDA or kainate receptors, so its protectivity against neurotoxicity in these cases is believed to be due to the blocking of Ca^{2+} influx through voltage-dependent calcium channels. By blocking these channels and preventing Ca^{2+} release, lomerizine increases circulation in the optic nerve head. These effects show that lomerizine may prove to be a useful treatment for ischemic retinal diseases, such as glaucoma.

Lomerizine also shows neuroprotective effects against secondary degeneration resulting from injury in retinal ganglion cells. In this case, increased membrane depolarization, in conjunction with the inability of the sodium-calcium exchanger to function due to depleted ATP stores, causes the activation of calcium-dependent signal transduction. These processes lead to cell death through either apoptosis or necrosis. Lomerizine's role in blocking Ca^{2+} can rescue these cells from death by preventing excitotoxicity. Decreased intracellular calcium also prevents necrosis by decreasing permeability, and apoptotic death is reduced through the reduction of calcium-dependent apoptotic agents.

While some calcium-channel blockers, such as flunarizine, act on the dopaminergic system, lomerizine is ineffective in vivo at inhibiting the release of dopamine. However, it has been observed to weakly inhibit the binding of [^{3}H]spiperone to D2 dopamine receptors in vitro. While researchers are unsure of the reason for this difference, one hypothesis is that the doses administered cannot reach a high enough concentration in the brain to affect D2 receptors.

== Medical use ==
Lomerizine is typically taken orally in a dose of 2 to 10 mg two to three times a day, but doses of 20 mg are not uncommon. It is also available in an intravenous solution of lomerizine hydrochloride, but the preferred route of administration, especially for treatment of the optic nerve, is oral.

In a clinical study, long-term lomerizine usage was shown to be both safe and effective in the treatment of migraines. However, efficacy of the drug decreases with age, with a significant correlation between age and efficacy at preventing migraine attacks. Efficacies of 47% to 71% have been reported, and gender seems to have no effect on efficacy of the drug.

Lomerizine may cause drowsiness and flushing, but it lacks the serious cardiovascular effects and hypotension produced by other calcium antagonists. This is hypothesized to be due to the drug's selectivity for cerebral arteries over peripheral arteries. No other side effects have been reported.

The acute toxicity for lomerizine in mice was found to be 44 mg/kg intravenously, 300 mg/kg orally, and over 1,200 mg/kg subcutaneously. Overdose can result in seizures or convulsions. The toxicity in humans has not been reported.

== Pharmacokinetics ==
Administered intravenously in rabbits at a dose of .03 mg/kg, the drug reached an average peak plasma concentration of 19.5 ± 6.5 ng/ml. This preparation had been completely metabolised within 60 minutes of administration. When administered to rats at a dose of 5 mg/kg, lomerizine reached a C_{max} of 27.6 ng/ML and T_{max} of 90 minutes. In guinea pig and dog aortic membranes, the drug displaced the binding of calcium agonist ^{3}H-Nitrendipine with an IC_{50} of 86 nM and a K_{i} of 340 nM.

When administered orally to healthy male subjects in 10, 20, and 40 mg doses, lomerizine produced peak plasma levels of ≈ 7.3, 15.7, and 31.3 ng/ml. In a group of 18 healthy adults, 10 mg of lomerizine administered orally had a half-life of 5.48 ± .90 hours, with a peak serum concentration (C_{max}) of 9.06 ± 2.46 ng/mL. T_{max} was reported as 2.72 ± .91 hours

The IC_{50} for lomerizine is reported to be 2430.0 nM in humans. The bioavailability of orally administered lomerizine is unaffected by gastric pH.
