= Dexamethasone/levofloxacin =

Medication

Combination of
- Dexamethasone: Corticosteroid
- Levofloxacin: Anti-infective

Clinical data
- Trade names: Levodexa
- Routes of administration: Eye drops
- ATC code: S01CA01 (WHO)

Legal status
- Legal status: CA: ℞-only

Dexamethasone/levofloxacin, sold under the brand name Levodexa, is a fixed-dose combination medication used for the prevention and treatment of inflammation, and the prevention of infection, associated with cataract surgery. It contains dexamethasone, a corticosteroid; and levofloxacin, an anti-infective.

It was approved for medical use in Canada in December 2023.

== Medical uses ==
Dexamethasone/levofloxacin is indicated for the prevention and treatment of inflammation, and the prevention of infection, associated with cataract surgery in adults.
