= Lemalesomab =

Monoclonal antibody

Monoclonal antibody
- Type: Whole antibody
- Source: Mouse
- Target: NCA-90 (granulocyte antigen)

Clinical data
- ATC code: none

Identifiers
- CAS Number: 250242-54-7
- ChemSpider: none
- UNII: 018649S21N

Lemalesomab is a mouse monoclonal antibody for the diagnosis of inflammatory lesions.
