= Cemdisiran =

Medication

Clinical data
- Trade names: Livsayis
- Other names: AD-62643, ALN-62643
- AHFS/Drugs.com: Livsayis
- License data: US DailyMed: Cemdisiran
- Routes of administration: Subcutaneous
- ATC code: None

Legal status
- Legal status: US: ℞-only

Identifiers
- CAS Number: 1639264-46-2
- UNII: S66Z65E10T

Cemdisiran, sold under the brand name Livsayis, is a medication used for the treatment of generalized myasthenia gravis. Cemdisiran is a complement C5-directed small interfering RNA, covalently linked to a ligand containing N-acetylgalactosamine. It is given by injection under the skin.

Cemdisiran was approved for medical use in the United States in November 2026.

== Medical uses ==
Cemdisiran is indicated for the treatment of generalized myasthenia gravis in adults who are anti-acetylcholine receptor antibody-positive.

== Contraindications ==
Cemdisiran is contraindicated for initiation in people with unresolved serious Neisseria meningitidis infection.

== Society and culture ==
=== Legal status ===
Cemdisiran was approved for medical use in the United States in November 2026. The US Food and Drug Administration granted the application for cemdisiran orphan drug designation.

=== Names ===
Cemdisiran is the international nonproprietary name.

Cemdisiran is sold under the brand name Livsayis.
