= Lirafugratinib =

Medication

Clinical data
- Trade names: Lyrfigtu
- Other names: RLY-4008
- AHFS/Drugs.com: Lyrfigtu
- License data: US DailyMed: Lirafugratinib
- Routes of administration: By mouth
- ATC code: None

Legal status
- Legal status: US: ℞-only

Identifiers
- IUPAC name: N-[4-[4-amino-5-[3-fluoro-4-(4-methylpyrimidin-2-yl)oxyphenyl]-7-methylpyrrolo[2,3-d]pyrimidin-6-yl]phenyl]-2-methylprop-2-enamide
- CAS Number: 2549174-42-5; as HCl: 2688040-45-9
- PubChem CID: 155309155; as HCl: 163377372
- ChemSpider: 115037102
- UNII: 7HY6IMH87S; as HCl: 4P76F4XM3B
- KEGG: D12455; as HCl: D12456

Chemical and physical data
- Formula: C_{28}H_{24}FN_{7}O_{2}
- Molar mass: 509.545 g·mol^{−1}
- 3D model (JSmol): Interactive image
- SMILES: CC1=NC(=NC=C1)OC2=C(C=C(C=C2)C3=C(N(C4=NC=NC(=C34)N)C)C5=CC=C(C=C5)NC(=O)C(=C)C)F
- InChI: InChI=1S/C28H24FN7O2/c1-15(2)27(37)35-19-8-5-17(6-9-19)24-22(23-25(30)32-14-33-26(23)36(24)4)18-7-10-21(20(29)13-18)38-28-31-12-11-16(3)34-28/h5-14H,1H2,2-4H3,(H,35,37)(H2,30,32,33); Key:XOQVZSSDIQQUGO-UHFFFAOYSA-N; Key:HLGJPRBWELSHLI-UHFFFAOYSA-N

Lirafugratinib, sold under the brand name Lyrfigtu, is an anti-cancer medication used for the treatment of cholangiocarcinoma (bile duct cancer). It is a kinase inhibitor that blocks fibroblast growth factor receptor 2. It is taken by mouth.

Lirafugratinib was approved for medical use in the United States in September 2026.

== Medical uses ==
Lirafugratinib is indicated for the treatment of adults with previously treated unresectable, locally advanced or metastatic cholangiocarcinoma harboring a fibroblast growth factor receptor 2 gene fusion or other rearrangement.

== Adverse effects ==
The US prescribing information includes warnings and precautions for ocular toxicity, hyperphosphatemia and soft tissue mineralization, and embryo-fetal toxicity.

== History ==
Efficacy was evaluated in REFOCUS (NCT04526106), a multi-center, open-label, single-arm trial in 116 participants with unresectable or metastatic cholangiocarcinoma who were naïve to fibroblast growth factor receptor inhibitor treatment and had received prior chemotherapy or chemoimmunotherapy. Participants received lirafugratinib 70 mg once daily until disease progression or unacceptable toxicity.

The US Food and Drug Administration granted the application for lirafugratinib priority review, breakthrough therapy, and orphan drug designations.

== Society and culture ==
=== Legal status ===
Lirafugratinib was approved for medical use in the United States in September 2026.

=== Names ===
Lirafugratinib is the international nonproprietary name.

Lirafugratinib is sold under the brand name Lyrfigtu.
