= Leptacline =

Names
- Preferred IUPAC name 1-(Cyclohexylmethyl)piperidine
- Other names Piperidino-1-(methylcyclohexane)

Identifiers
CAS Number	5005-72-1
3D model (JSmol)	Interactive image
ChemSpider	64719
PubChem CID	71660
UNII	5DXM29256P
CompTox Dashboard (EPA)	DTXSID80198196
- InChI: InChI=1S/C12H23N/c1-3-7-12(8-4-1)11-13-9-5-2-6-10-13/h12H,1-11H2 Key: SFSYFLJDJQTPNM-UHFFFAOYSA-N
- SMILES: C1CCC(CC1)CN2CCCCC2

Properties
Chemical formula	C_{12}H_{23}N
Molar mass	181.323 g·mol^{−1}
- Except where otherwise noted, data are given for materials in their standard state (at 25 °C [77 °F], 100 kPa). Infobox references

Leptacline (INN; developmental code name SD 210-32) is a drug described as a respiratory stimulant that was never marketed. It has a similar chemical structure to various piperidine and piperazine psychostimulants.

== See also ==
- 2-Benzylpiperidine
- 4-Benzylpiperidine
- Benzylpiperazine
