= 2,5-Dimethoxy-4-hydroxyamphetamine =

DOOH

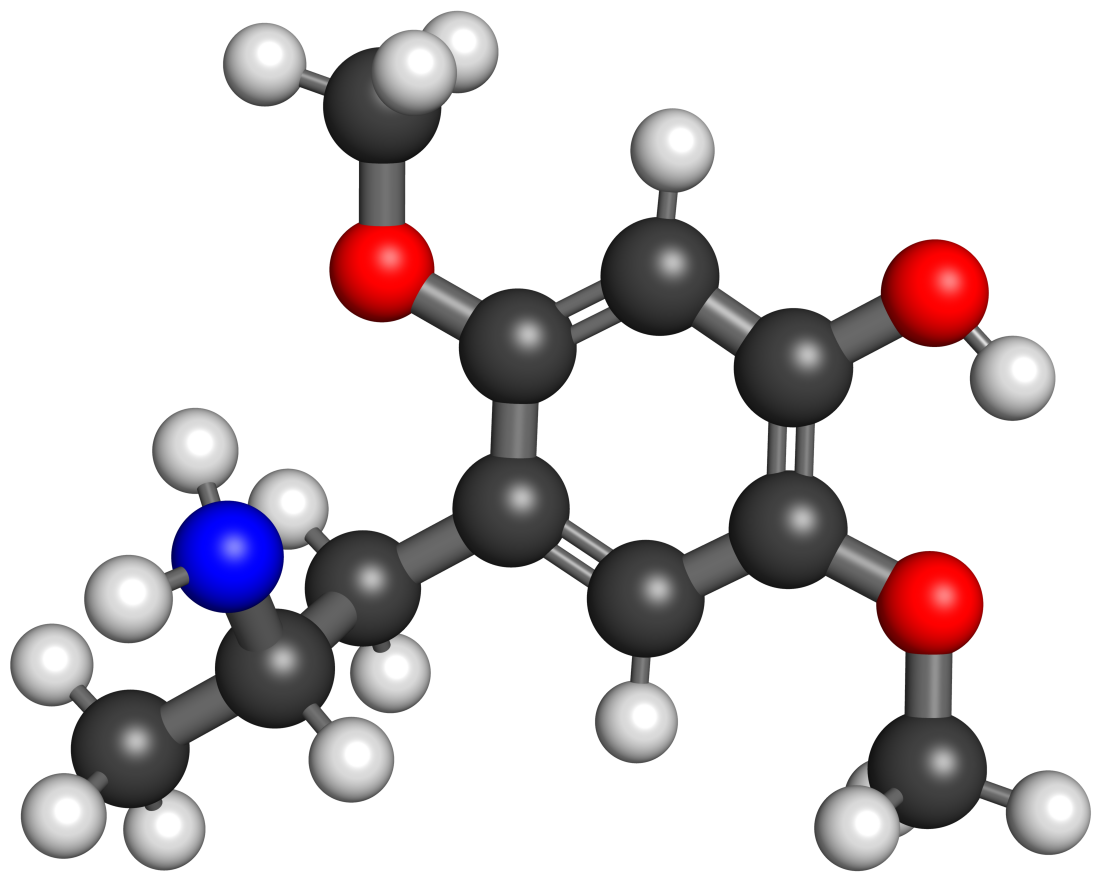

Clinical data
- Other names: DOOH; 2,5-Dimethoxy-4-hydroxyamphetamine; 4-Hydroxy-2,5-dimethoxyamphetamine
- ATC code: None

Legal status
- Legal status: Generally not controlled

Identifiers
- IUPAC name: 4-(2-aminopropyl)-2,5-dimethoxyphenol
- PubChem CID: 44265202
- ChemSpider: 23108622
- ChEMBL: ChEMBL8352

Chemical and physical data
- Formula: C_{11}H_{17}NO_{3}
- Molar mass: 211.261 g·mol^{−1}
- 3D model (JSmol): Interactive image
- SMILES: CC(CC1=CC(=C(C=C1OC)O)OC)N
- InChI: InChI=1S/C11H17NO3/c1-7(12)4-8-5-11(15-3)9(13)6-10(8)14-2/h5-7,13H,4,12H2,1-3H3; Key:XZYTWVYCADLTTI-UHFFFAOYSA-N

DOOH, also known as 2,5-dimethoxy-4-hydroxyamphetamine, is a chemical compound of the phenethylamine, amphetamine, and DOx families related to the psychedelic drug DOM. In contrast to DOM and other DOx drugs, DOOH appears to be inactive.

== Pharmacology ==
=== Pharmacodynamics ===
DOOH showed no affinity for the serotonin 5-HT_{2A} receptor (K_{i} = >50,000 nM). This was in notable contrast to closely related compounds like DOM (the 4-methyl analogue) and TMA-2 (the 4-methoxy analogue) (K_{i} = 100 nM and 1,250 nM, respectively). Hence, DOOH showed more than 40- to 500-fold lower affinity for the receptor than these analogues.

== Chemistry ==
=== Synthesis ===
The chemical synthesis of DOOH has been described.

== History ==
DOOH was first described in the scientific literature by George Anderson and colleagues by 1978. Subsequently, its pharmacology was described by Richard Glennon and colleagues in 1989 and 1990.

== See also ==
- DOx (psychedelics)
