= Losigamone =

Chemical compound

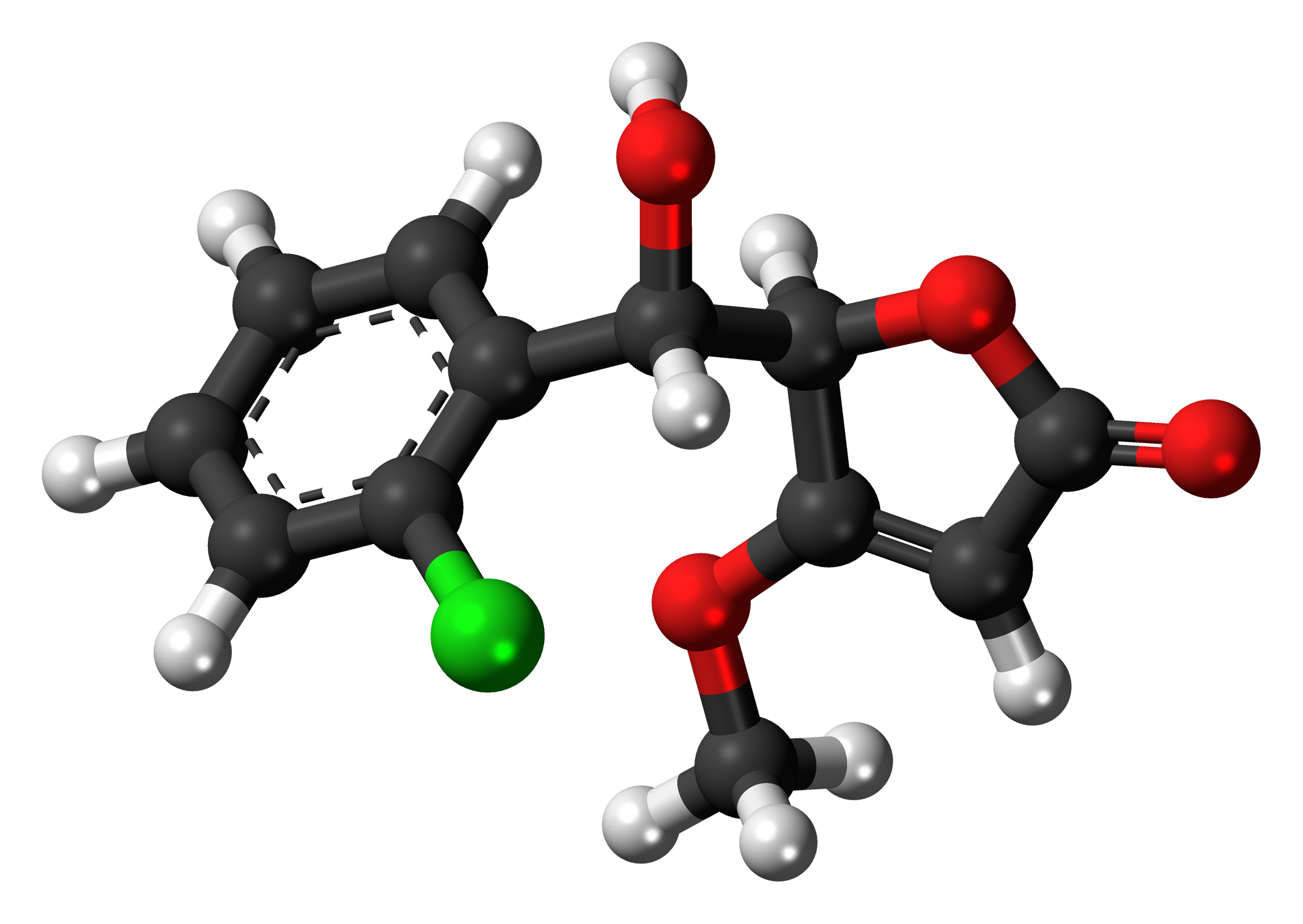

Clinical data
- ATC code: none

Legal status
- Legal status: Investigational

Identifiers
- IUPAC name: (2R)-2-[(S)-(2-chlorophenyl)-hydroxymethyl]-3-methoxy-2H-furan-5-one
- CAS Number: 112856-44-7
- PubChem CID: 6918049
- ChemSpider: 5293266
- UNII: 84R8O3QM2G

Chemical and physical data
- Formula: C_{12}H_{11}ClO_{4}
- Molar mass: 254.67 g·mol^{−1}
- 3D model (JSmol): Interactive image
- SMILES: Clc1ccccc1C(O)C2OC(=O)C=C2OC
- InChI: InChI=1S/C12H11ClO4/c1-16-9-6-10(14)17-12(9)11(15)7-4-2-3-5-8(7)13/h2-6,11-12,15H,1H3/t11-,12-/m0/s1; Key:ICDNYWJQGWNLFP-RYUDHWBXSA-N

Losigamone (INN) is an investigational drug for the treatment of epilepsy. It has been studied as an add-on treatment for partial seizures. Phase III clinical trials were conducted around the year 2000.

== Mechanism of action ==
The mechanism of action is not known. Data regarding the interaction of losigamone with GABA receptors are inconsistent: it increases GABA-induced chloride influx in spinal cord neuron cultures, but has no significant influence on GABAergic inhibitory postsynaptic potentials in hippocampal slices. Interaction with potassium and sodium channels has been proposed. Results from both in vitro and in vivo experiments confirm that the pharmacological activity profiles of the two losigamone enantiomers are not identical and suggest further that excitatory amino acid-mediated processes are involved in the mode of action of (+)-losigamone (the compound shown in the image) whereas (–)-losigamone does not possess such properties.
