= Lupitidine =

Chemical compound

Clinical data
- ATC code: None

Identifiers
- IUPAC name: 2-[2-[[5-(2-Aminopropan-2-yl)furan-2-yl]methylsulfanyl]ethylamino]-5-[(6-methylpyridin-3-yl)methyl]-1H-pyrimidin-6-one
- CAS Number: 83903-06-4
- PubChem CID: 51671
- ChemSpider: 3577726
- UNII: WF028DWK9N
- KEGG: D04794
- CompTox Dashboard (EPA): DTXSID5043760

Chemical and physical data
- Formula: C_{21}H_{27}N_{5}O_{2}S
- Molar mass: 413.54 g·mol^{−1}
- 3D model (JSmol): Interactive image
- SMILES: CC1=NC=C(C=C1)CC2=CN=C(NC2=O)NCCSCC3=CC=C(O3)C(C)(C)N
- InChI: InChI=1S/C21H27N5O2S/c1-14-4-5-15(11-24-14)10-16-12-25-20(26-19(16)27)23-8-9-29-13-17-6-7-18(28-17)21(2,3)22/h4-7,11-12H,8-10,13,22H2,1-3H3,(H2,23,25,26,27); Key:CZTPLYMKHNEVHO-UHFFFAOYSA-N

Lupitidine (INN; lupitidine hydrochloride (USAN); development code SKF-93479) is a long-acting H_{2} receptor antagonist developed by Smith, Kline & French and described as an antiulcerogenic that was never marketed. It was shown to inhibit nocturnal gastric acid secretion and, in experiments on rodents, produced diffuse neuroendocrine cell hyperplasia and an increase in multifocal glandular hyperplasia due to hypergastrinemia resulting from the pharmacological suppression of gastric acid secretion.
