= Lerodalcibep =

Clinical data
- Pronunciation: /ˌlɛroʊˈdælsɪbɛp/ LER-oh-DAL-sih-bep
- Trade names: Lerochol, Lyrokaul
- Other names: lerodalcibep-liga
- AHFS/Drugs.com: Monograph
- MedlinePlus: a626018
- License data: US DailyMed: Lerodalcibep
- Routes of administration: Subcutaneous
- ATC code: C10AX19 (WHO)

Legal status
- Legal status: US: ℞-only; EU: Rx-only

Identifiers
- CAS Number: 2250073-78-8
- PubChem CID: 505794687
- DrugBank: DB19071
- UNII: 1PHP3QG5PZ
- KEGG: D13095

Lerodalcibep, sold under the brand names Lerochol and Lyrokaul, is a medication used for the treatment of hypercholesterolemia (high cholesterol). It is a recombinant fusion protein that contains a proprotein convertase subtilisin/kexin type 9 (PCSK9) inhibitor and human serum albumin.

The most common side effects are injection site reactions.

Lerodalcibep was approved for medical use in the United States in December 2025.

== Medical uses ==
Lerodalcibep is indicated as an adjunct to diet and exercise to reduce low-density lipoprotein cholesterol (LDL-C) in adults with hypercholesterolemia, including heterozygous familial hypercholesterolemia.

== Society and culture ==
=== Legal status ===
Lerodalcibep was approved for medical use in the United States in December 2025.

In July 2026, the Committee for Medicinal Products for Human Use of the European Medicines Agency adopted a positive opinion, recommending the granting of a marketing authorization for the medicinal product Lyrokaul, intended for the treatment of adults with hypercholesterolemia and mixed dyslipidemia. The applicant for this medicinal product is LIB Therapeutics. Lerodalcibep was authorized for medical use in the European Union in September 2026.

=== Names ===
Lerodalcibep is the international nonproprietary name.

Lerodalcibep is sold under the brand names Lerochol and Lyrokaul.
