= Levisoprenaline =

Clinical data
- Other names: l-Isoprenaline; l-Isoproterenol; (-)-Isoproterenol; (R)-Isoprenaline; (-)-Isoprenaline; (R)-Isoproterenol; L-(-)-Isoproterenol
- Drug class: Sympathomimetic; β-Adrenergic receptor agonist; Bronchodilator

Identifiers
- IUPAC name: 4-[(1R)-1-hydroxy-2-(propan-2-ylamino)ethyl]benzene-1,2-diol
- CAS Number: 51-31-0
- PubChem CID: 443372
- ChemSpider: 391604
- UNII: 588N0603CT
- KEGG: C11703
- ChEBI: CHEBI:6257
- ChEMBL: ChEMBL1160723
- PDB ligand: 5FW (PDBe, RCSB PDB)
- CompTox Dashboard (EPA): DTXSID2043878
- ECHA InfoCard: 100.161.507

Chemical and physical data
- Formula: C_{11}H_{17}NO_{3}
- Molar mass: 211.261 g·mol^{−1}
- 3D model (JSmol): Interactive image
- SMILES: CC(C)NC[C@@H](C1=CC(=C(C=C1)O)O)O
- InChI: InChI=1S/C11H17NO3/c1-7(2)12-6-11(15)8-3-4-9(13)10(14)5-8/h3-5,7,11-15H,6H2,1-2H3/t11-/m0/s1; Key:JWZZKOKVBUJMES-NSHDSACASA-N

Levisoprenaline (INN) is a sympathomimetic, β-adrenergic receptor agonist, and bronchodilator which was never marketed. It is the levorotatory or (R)-enantiomer of isoprenaline.
