= Robert S. Rosenson =

- Education: Tulane University (BS); Harvard medical school; University of Chicago Medical Center
- Awards: Received Foundation of the National Lipid Association 2019 Clinician/Educator Award
- Scientific career
- Workplaces: Icahn School of Medicine
- Website: www.mountsinai.org/profiles/robert-rosenson

Dr. Robert S. Rosenson is a Professor of Medicine and also lending his services as the Director of cardio metabolic disorders at the Icahn School of Medicine at Mount Sinai.

== Education ==
Dr. Robert S. Rosenson earned his medical degree from Tulane University. He did his residency in internal medicine at the Brigham and women’s hospital, Harvard medical school and obtained a fellowship in cardiovascular medicine at the University of Chicago hospital.

== Research and career ==
Dr. Robert S. Rosenson studies the effects of lipid-lowering therapy in different regions of the United States. He researches selective inhibitors of inflammatory pathways such as lipoprotein-associated with phospholipase A2, and also did research on the efficacy and safety of evolocumab in patients with type 2 diabetes mellitus and hypercholesterolemia.

Dr. Robert Rosenson served as the Director of the Preventive Cardiology Center at Rush-Presbyterian-St. Luke’s Medical Center. At the University Of Michigan School Of Medicine, he served as the Director of the lipoprotein disorders and clinical atherosclerosis research. Now, he is currently serving at the Mount Sinai Icahn School of Medicine as a Professor of Medicine.

== Awards and honors ==
Dr. Robert S. Rosenson was the recipient of the 2019 Clinician/Educator Award by the National Lipid Association. Additional awards include the Ground-Breaking Doctors Award from Chicago Magazine, Simon Dack Award, and received the Jan. J. Kellerman Memorial Award in 2016.

He is a fellow of a number of committees include the American College of Cardiology, American College of Physicians, American Heart Association Council on Epidemiology and Prevention, European Society of Cardiology, and National Lipid Association.

== Publications ==
- Robert S. Rosenson, and Christine C. Tangney. "Antiatherothrombotic Properties of Statins: Implications for Cardiovascular Event Reduction". JAMA Network.
- Robert S. Rosenson, H. Bryan Brewer, M. John Chapman, Sergio Fazio, M. Mahmood Hussain, Anatol Kontush, Ronald M. Krauss, James D. Otvos, Alan T. Remaley, and Ernst J. Schaefer. "HDL Measures, Particle Heterogeneity, Proposed Nomenclature, and Relation to Atherosclerotic Cardiovascular Events". Journal of clinical chemistry.
- Robert S. Rosenson, H. Bryan Brewer, W. Sean Davidson, Zahi A. Fayad, Valentin Fuster, James Goldstein, Marc Heller stein, Xian-Cheng Jiang, Michael C. Phillips, Daniel J. Rader, Alan T. Remaley, George H. Roth blat, Alan R. Tall, and Laurent Yvan-Charvet. "Cholesterol efflux and atheroprotection: advancing the concept of reverse cholesterol transport". AHA Journals.
- Robert S Rosenson, Christine C Tangney, and Larry C Casey. "Inhibition of proinflammatory cytokine production by pravastatin". The Lancet. DOI: https://doi.org/10.1016/S0140-6736(98)05917-0 Robert S Rosenson, James D Otvos, and David S Freedman. "Relations of lipoprotein subclass levels and low-density lipoprotein size to the progression of coronary artery disease in the pravastatin limitation of atherosclerosis in the coronary arteries (PLAC-I) trial". The American Journal of Cardiology.
