= Enlicitide chloride =

Cholesterol-lowering medication

- Enlicitide decanoate

Clinical data
- Trade names: Lipfendra
- Other names: MK-0616, enlicitide decanoate (USAN US)
- AHFS/Drugs.com: lipfendra
- License data: US DailyMed: Enlicitide
- Routes of administration: By mouth
- ATC code: None

Legal status
- Legal status: US: ℞-only

Identifiers
- IUPAC name: [6-6-[[(11S,17S,20S,23S,27S,39S,42S,63S,66R)-47-fluoro-20-[(1R)-1-hydroxyethyl]-17-[(4-methoxyphenyl)methyl]-11,63-dimethyl-10,16,19,22,30,40,58,61,64,67,70-undecaoxo-28-oxa-1,9,15,18,21,24,31,41,51,62,65,68-dodecazanonacyclo[37.18.11.23,6.124,42.133,37.144,51.011,15.023,27.045,50]triheptaconta-3(73),4,6(72),33,35,37(71),44(69),45(50),46,48-decaen-66-yl]methylamino]-6-oxohexyl]-trimethylazanium chloride
- CAS Number: 2407527-16-4; 2861205-06-1
- PubChem CID: 166642685; 172866837
- IUPHAR/BPS: 13944
- UNII: 3D2DNA8NXK; PSR59MCX5M
- KEGG: D13186
- ChEMBL: ChEMBL6067978; ChEMBL6068420

Chemical and physical data
- Formula: C_{82}H_{110}ClFN_{14}O_{15}
- Molar mass: 1586.31 g·mol^{−1}
- 3D model (JSmol): Interactive image; Interactive image
- SMILES: C[C@H]1C(=O)N[C@H](CNC(=O)CCCCC[N+](C)(C)C)C(=O)N[C@H]2Cc3cccc(c3)CNC(=O)CO[C@H]4CCN5[C@]4([H])C(=O)N[C@@H]([C@@H](C)O)C(=O)N[C@@H](Cc6ccc(cc6)OC)C(=O)N7CCC[C@@]7(C)C(=O)NCCc8ccc(cc8)CN(CCCCCCn9cc(C[C@@H](C5=O)NC2=O)c%10cc(ccc%109)F)C(=O)CCC(=O)N1.[Cl-]; C[C@H]1C(=O)N[C@@H](C(=O)N[C@H]2CC3=CC(=CC=C3)CNC(=O)CO[C@H]4CCN5[C@@H]4C(=O)N[C@H](C(=O)N[C@H](C(=O)N6CCC[C@]6(C(=O)NCCC7=CC=C(CN(CCCCCCN8C=C(C[C@@H](C5=O)NC2=O)C9=C8C=CC(=C9)F)C(=O)CCC(=O)N1)C=C7)C)CC1=CC=C(C=C1)OC)[C@@H](C)O)CNC(=O)CCCCC[N+](C)(C)C.CCCCCCCCCC(=O)[O-]
- InChI: InChI=1S/C82H109FN14O15.ClH/c1-51-74(103)91-65(47-86-68(99)19-11-10-14-40-97(4,5)6)76(105)88-62-43-56-17-15-18-57(41-56)46-85-70(101)50-112-67-33-39-95-73(67)78(107)92-72(52(2)98)77(106)90-63(42-54-24-27-60(111-7)28-25-54)80(109)96-38-16-34-82(96,3)81(110)84-35-32-53-20-22-55(23-21-53)48-94(71(102)31-30-69(100)87-51)37-13-9-8-12-36-93-49-58(44-64(79(95)108)89-75(62)104)61-45-59(83)26-29-66(61)93;/h15,17-18,20-29,41,45,49,51-52,62-65,67,72-73,98H,8-14,16,19,30-40,42-44,46-48,50H2,1-7H3,(H8-,84,85,86,87,88,89,90,91,92,99,100,101,103,104,105,106,107,110);1H/t51-,52+,62-,63-,64-,65+,67-,72-,73-,82-;/m0./s1; Key:CLOLWQCFULXMAR-QQCDJELVSA-N; InChI=1S/C82H109FN14O15.C10H20O2/c1-51-74(103)91-65(47-86-68(99)19-11-10-14-40-97(4,5)6)76(105)88-62-43-56-17-15-18-57(41-56)46-85-70(101)50-112-67-33-39-95-73(67)78(107)92-72(52(2)98)77(106)90-63(42-54-24-27-60(111-7)28-25-54)80(109)96-38-16-34-82(96,3)81(110)84-35-32-53-20-22-55(23-21-53)48-94(71(102)31-30-69(100)87-51)37-13-9-8-12-36-93-49-58(44-64(79(95)108)89-75(62)104)61-45-59(83)26-29-66(61)93;1-2-3-4-5-6-7-8-9-10(11)12/h15,17-18,20-29,41,45,49,51-52,62-65,67,72-73,98H,8-14,16,19,30-40,42-44,46-48,50H2,1-7H3,(H8-,84,85,86,87,88,89,90,91,92,99,100,101,103,104,105,106,107,110);2-9H2,1H3,(H,11,12)/t51-,52+,62-,63-,64-,65+,67-,72-,73-,82-;/m0./s1; Key:ZMLCOVYFOZPADV-QQCDJELVSA-N

Enlicitide chloride, sold under the brand name Lipfendra as the salt enlicitide decanoate, is a medication used for the treatment of hypercholesterolemia (high cholesterol). It is an orally available macrocyclic peptide and a proprotein convertase subtilisin/kexin type 9 (PCSK9) inhibitor. It is taken by mouth.

Enlicitide decanoate was approved for medical use in the United States in July 2026.

== Medical uses ==
Enlicitide decanoate is indicated as an adjunct to diet and exercise to reduce low-density lipoprotein cholesterol in adults with hypercholesterolemia, including heterozygous familial hypercholesterolemia.

== Pharmacology ==
Enlicitide interacts with the LDL receptor binding domain of PCSK9 and inhibits its interaction with the receptor with an IC_{50} of 2.5 ±0.1 nM.

Enlicitide has poor oral bioavailability and is therefore formulated as the decanoate salt with additional sodium decanoate in the dose. Decanoate acts as a stabilizer and permeation enhancer, allowing enlicitide to pass through the intestine and, by temporarily opening tight junctions between intestinal epithelial cells, to cross the intestinal wall. Food in the intestinal tract inhibits this process.

== History ==
Merck developed the drug, applied for US Food and Drug Administration (FDA) approval in 2026, and received approval in July 2026.

In August 2023, Merck launched the phase III CORALreef Lipids clinical trial (NCT05952856) to evaluate the efficacy and safety of enlicitide decanoate (the decanoate salt of MK-0616) in adults with hypercholesterolemia. The study included 2,912 participants.

Also in August 2023, the company launched the CORALreef HeFH trial (NCT05952869) to evaluate the efficacy, safety, and tolerability of enlicitide decanoate in adults with heterozygous familial hypercholesterolemia.

The efficacy and safety of enlicitide were demonstrated in two randomized, double-blind, placebo-controlled trials (NCT05952856 [CORALreef Lipids] and NCT05952869 [CORALreef HeFH]) in a total of 3,207 adults with severe hypercholesterolemia, including those with and without heterozygous familial hypercholesterolemia, who were already taking maximally tolerated statin therapy. The primary endpoint for both trials was the percent change from baseline to week 24 in LDL-C, compared to placebo. The trials showed enlicitide lowered LDL cholesterol by about 56% to 60% in participants undergoing concurrent lipid-lowering therapy over 24 to 52 weeks. Other lipid parameters also improved, including non-HDL cholesterol, apolipoprotein B, and lipoprotein(a). The safety of oral enlicitide was similar to placebo.

== Society and culture ==
=== Legal status ===
Enlicitide decanoate was approved for medical use in the United States in July 2026.

The US Food and Drug Administration (FDA) granted the application for enlicitide priority review designation. The FDA granted the approval of Lipfendra to Merck Sharp & Dohme.

=== Names ===
Enlicitide chloride is the international nonproprietary name. Enlicitide decanoate is the United States Adopted Name.

Enlicitide decanoate is sold under the brand name Lipfendra.
