= Verve PCSK9-inhibitor gene therapy =

PCSK9 inhibitor

VERVE-101 and VERVE-102 are an experimental gene therapy developed by Verve Therapeutics that targets the PCSK9 gene and is intended to reduce blood cholesterol levels. It works on the same protein as the cholesterol-lowering drugs known as PCSK9 inhibitors but, unlike them, is permanent. It works via base editing, a form of CRISPR gene editing. It is one of the first gene therapies that could be beneficial to a broad segment of the population, in contrast to earlier gene therapies that were developed to treat a rare genetic disorder. Both treatments use the same RNA gene editing technology, but they use a different lipid nanoparticle delivery vehicle.

== Lilly Inc. Acquisition of Verve Therapeutics ==
Lilly Inc.'s acquisition of Verve Therapeutics, Inc. was announced as a major biotechnology transaction in the gene-editing and cardiovascular therapeutics sector on June 17, 2025. Under the terms of the agreement, Lilly Inc. acquired 100% of Verve Therapeutics' equity. The acquisition is widely viewed as a strategic move to accelerate Lilly’s expansion into in vivo gene-editing therapies.

== Research ==
Verve Therapeutics voluntarily paused the Phase I Heart-1 trial of VERVE-101 after one out of six patients developed a transient Grade 3 drug-induced elevations of alanine aminotransferase and Grade 3 thrombocytopenia.

In May 2026, the results of the Phase I Heart-2 trial were published in the New England Journal of Medicine. A total of 35 subjects with familial hypercholesterolemia or premature atherosclerosis received one intravenous infusion of VERVE-102 at one of six doses in an open-label, single-ascending-dose study and had at least 28 days of follow-up. Circulating PCSK9 protein and LDL cholesterol were reduced in a dose-dependent fashion, with mean LDL-C reduced by 62% (78 mg/dL) at the highest dose. The effect appeared to persist for at least 1 year of followup.
