= Sterolin =

Family of protein complexes

ATP-binding cassette, sub-family G (WHITE), member 5 (sterolin 1)

Identifiers
- Symbol: ABCG5
- NCBI gene: 64240
- HGNC: 13886
- OMIM: 605459
- RefSeq: NM_022436
- UniProt: Q9H222

Other data
- Locus: Chr. 2 p21
Search for
- Structures: Swiss-model
- Domains: InterPro

ATP-binding cassette, sub-family G (WHITE), member 8 (sterolin 2)

Identifiers
- Symbol: ABCG8
- NCBI gene: 64241
- HGNC: 13887
- OMIM: 605460
- RefSeq: NM_022437
- UniProt: Q9H221

Other data
- Locus: Chr. 2 p21
Search for
- Structures: Swiss-model
- Domains: InterPro

ABCG5 and ABCG8 genes encode for two proteins sterolin-1 and -2, respectively. Sterolin-1 and –2 are two ‘half’ adenosine triphosphate binding (ATP) cassette (ABC) transporters which have been found to be indispensable for the regulation of sterol absorption and excretion. Mutations in either genes result in a lipid disorder, sitosterolemia.

== Locus of the genes ==
The molecular mechanisms regulating the absorption of dietary sterols in the body are poorly understood, and as sitosterolemia is a rare autosomal recessively inherited lipid metabolic disorder characterized by hyperabsorption and decreased biliary excretion of dietary sterols, studies have focused on the molecular basis of sitosterolemia to shed light on important principles concerning intestinal sterol absorption as well as cholesterol secretion into bile.

In 1998, sitosterolemia (STSL) locus has been mapped to the short arm of human chromosome 2 (2p21) after studying 10 well-characterized families with this disorder. Subsequently, the STSL locus has been further localized to a less than 2 centimorgans (cM) region.

In 2001, The STSL locus was found to be comprises two genes, ABCG5 and ABCG8, encoding 2 members of the ABC-transporter family, named sterolin-1 and sterolin-2, respectively, Sterolin-2, discovered after sterolin-1, is located <400 base pair (bp) upstream of sterolin-1 in the opposite orientation.

== Structure of the encoded proteins ==
Typical ABC transporter consists of two transmembrane domains and two nucleotide-binding domains. However, the ABCG or White subfamily with its five fully characterized human members consists of half-size ABC proteins which probably dimerize to form active membrane transporters. In our case, it is suggested that ABCG5 and ABCG8 form a heterodimer. Among the half-size molecules, ABCG proteins have a peculiar domain organization characterized by a nucleotide-binding domain at the N-terminus followed by six transmembrane-spanning domains.

== Function ==
Under normal circumstances, a western diet contains almost equal amounts of cholesterol and noncholesterol sterols (such as plant sterols sitosterol, campesterol, and brassicasterol). However, only about 55% of total dietary cholesterol is absorbed and retained while almost none of the noncholesterol sterols are retained since the small amount of dietary non-cholesterols that do enter the body are rapidly excreted by the liver into bile, almost unchanged.

Sterolins are likely involved both in the selective transport of dietary cholesterol in and out of enterocytes and in selective sterol excretion by the liver into bile, as evidenced by the consequences when it is deficient or over expressed. The exact mechanism(s) whereby ABCG5/ABCG8 exert their effects on sterol metabolism has not yet been clarified. But it is suggested that the ABCG5/ABCG8 heterodimer shuttles cholesterol from the inner leaflet of the canalicular membrane through a chamber formed by the two half-transporters. Following ATP binding and hydrolysis, the complex undergoes a conformational change, flipping a cholesterol molecule into the outer membrane leaflet in a configuration that favors its release into the canalicular space.

Based on the clinical defects in sitosterolemia, ABCG5/ABCG8 are expressed in the liver and/or the intestine. 5 These genes respond to environmental dietary sterols, although whether they are also increased by high phytosterols has yet to be determined.

It is worth to mention that other gene products play a role in dietary-cholesterol transport (such as ABCA1).

== Disorders involving ABCG5 and ABCG8 genes ==
Mutations in both alleles of either ABCG5 or ABCG8 in the human results in sitosterolemia. Sitosterolemia (also known as phytosterolemia) is a rare autosomal recessively inherited lipid metabolic disorder characterized by the presence of tendon xanthomas, premature coronary artery disease and atherosclerotic disease, hemolytic episodes, arthralgias and arthritis. The hallmark of sitosterolemia is diagnostically elevated levels of plant sterols in the plasma.
