= Sitosterolemia =

Genetically-inherited lipid metabolic disorder

- Other names: Phytosterolemia, xenosterolemia
- Autosomal recessive is the manner in which this condition is inherited.
- Specialty: Endocrinology

Sitosterolemia, also known as phytosterolemia, is a rare autosomal recessively inherited lipid metabolic disorder. It is characterized by hyperabsorption and decreased biliary excretion of dietary sterols (including the phytosterol beta-sitosterol). Healthy persons absorb only about 5% of dietary plant sterols, but sitosterolemia patients absorb 15% to 60% of ingested sitosterol without excreting much into the bile. It's named after the most abundant phytosterol in the diet, sitosterol, though other phytosterols are also involved. The phytosterol campesterol is more readily absorbed than sitosterol.

Sitosterolemia patients develop hypercholesterolemia, tendon and tuberous xanthomas, premature development of atherosclerosis, and abnormal hematologic and liver function test results.

== Signs and symptoms ==
Sitosterolemia may share several clinical characteristics with the well-characterized familial hypercholesterolemia (FH), such as the development of tendon xanthomas in the first 10 years of life and the development of premature atherosclerosis. However, in contrast to FH patients, sitosterolemia patients usually have normal to moderately elevated total sterol levels and very high levels of plant sterols (sitosterol, campesterol, stigmasterol, avenosterol) and 5α-saturated stanols in their plasma. Plasma sitosterol levels in sitosterolemia patients are 10–25 times higher than in unaffected individuals (8–60 mg/dl). Not all patients with sitosterolemia have tendon xanthomas, thus, the absence of this should not be used to exclude this diagnosis.

Xanthomas may appear at any age, even in childhood. These may be present as subcutaneous xanthomas on the buttocks in children or in characteristic locations (e.g., Achilles tendon, extensor tendons of the hand) in children and adults. Xanthelasma and corneal arcus are less common. Decreased range of motion with possible redness, swelling, and warmth of joints due to arthritis may be present. In addition, sitosterolemia patients may develop hemolytic episodes and splenomegaly. The liver may also be involved, as one case initially presented with cirrhosis.

Untreated, the condition causes a significant increase in morbidity and mortality. Coronary heart disease and its health consequences are the primary causes of illness and premature death in untreated patients. This disease is likely under-diagnosed.

Premature atherosclerosis in patients with sitosterolemia may be due to severe hypercholesterolemia observed in the early stage of life. The increased plasma cholesterol levels decline rapidly in adulthood.

== Pathogenesis ==
Mammalian cells cannot use plant sterols. Normally, plant sterols are poorly absorbed from the gastrointestinal tract; fewer than 5% of plant sterols are absorbed compared to approximately 40% of cholesterol absorbed. The liver preferentially excretes plant sterols over cholesterol. Dietary sterols enter intestinal cells via NPC1L1, which prefers cholesterol over plant sterols. About 50%–60% of cholesterol is esterified by SOAT2 and transported to liver via the chylomicrons. SOAT2 also esterifies plant sterols but prefers cholesterol, so most plant sterols remain in the cell. In a healthy subject, the ABCG5/ABCG8 sterol efflux transporter pumps any unesterified sterols back into the gut lumen. Sterols not pumped back also end up in the chylomicrons destinated for the liver.

Sitosterolemia is inherited as a rare autosomal recessive condition. It has been shown to result from loss-of-function mutations in either of two adjacent and oppositely oriented genes (ABCG5 and ABCG8) located in chromosome 2 in band 2p21 and encode for ABC transporter proteins named sterolin-1 and sterolin-2, respectively. The two proteins form a heterodimer and both need to be functional to produce a working transporter, so mutation abolishes its functionality. In the intestines, the active pumping back of sterols fails to happen, and about 15% to 60% of ingested sitosterol becomes absorbed.

Loss of a functional transporter also causes the liver to have drastically reduced sterol excretion ability. While bile acid synthesis remains the same as in healthy people, the total excretion of sterols in the bile is reportedly less than 50% in subjects with sitosterolemia compared to control subjects. Loss of hepatic excretion plays a key role in pathogenesis: receiving a liver transplant from a healthy donor causes a 90% reduction in plant sterol levels. Animals with a dysfunctional transporter in either the liver or the intestines do not show signs of disease; only when both are dysfunctional does the disorder manifest.

Patients have markedly reduced whole-body cholesterol biosynthesis associated with suppressed hepatic, ileal, and mononuclear leukocyte HMG-CoA reductase, the rate-controlling enzyme in the cholesterol biosynthetic pathway. This is coupled with significantly increased low-density lipoprotein (LDL) receptor expression. Sitosterol is not believed to be responsible for this effect; instead, stigmasterol and campesterol likely cause it by inhibiting the processing and activation of SREBP-2.

== Diagnosis ==
Diagnosis is made by measuring serum plant sterol concentrations.

== Treatment ==
The disorder is treated by strictly reducing the intake of foods rich in plant sterols (e.g., vegetable oils, olives, and avocados). However, dietary therapy is often insufficient to control this disease since plant sterols are constituents of all plant-based foods. Statins have been used, and while these lower cholesterol levels and may ameliorate atherosclerotic disease, plant sterol levels are not lowered by their use alone.

If dietary treatment alone is insufficient, bile acid-binding resins (e.g., cholestyramine, colestipol) could be considered. In October 2002, a new cholesterol absorption inhibitor, ezetimibe, received US Food and Drug Administration (FDA) approval for use in sitosterolemia. This drug is now the standard of care, as it blocks sterol entry and can be used in combination with bile-acid resins.

Finally, ileal bypass has been performed in select cases to decrease the levels of plant sterols in the body, though this therapy was undertaken before the advent of ezetimibe.

== Epidemiology ==
Around 100 cases have been reported in the literature worldwide; hence, this condition appears to be relatively rare. It is probable that sitosterolemia is significantly underdiagnosed and many patients are probably misdiagnosed as having hyperlipidemia. Some sources estimate a prevalence of 1 in 50,000.

Because ezetimibe is also used to lower cholesterol levels, some patients may give false-negative results on testing.

== See also ==
- ABCG5 and ABCG8 Genes
- Cerebrotendinous xanthomatosis
