= NCEP =

NCEP may refer to:

- National Cholesterol Education Program
- National Centers for Environmental Prediction
