= Bococizumab =

Chemical compound

Monoclonal antibody
- Type: Whole antibody
- Source: Humanized (from mouse)
- Target: Proprotein convertase subtilisin/kexin type 9 (PCSK9)

Clinical data
- Routes of administration: Subcutaneous injection
- ATC code: none

Legal status
- Legal status: Investigational

Identifiers
- CAS Number: 1407495-02-6
- PubChem SID: 194168554
- IUPHAR/BPS: 7730
- ChemSpider: none
- UNII: 45M75JVK38
- KEGG: D10621
- ChEMBL: ChEMBL3137349

Chemical and physical data
- Formula: C_{6414}H_{9918}N_{1722}O_{2012}S_{54}
- Molar mass: 145077.18 g·mol^{−1}

Bococizumab (USAN; development code RN316) is a drug that was in development by Pfizer targeting PCSK9 to reduce LDL cholesterol. Pfizer withdrew the drug from development in November 2016, determining that it was "not likely to provide value to patients, physicians or shareholders."

== Description ==
Bococizumab is a monoclonal antibody that inhibits PCSK9, a protein that interferes with the removal of LDL. LDL levels are a major risk factor for cardiovascular disease.

== Clinical trials ==
A phase 2b study of statin patients was presented at the 2014 American College of Cardiology. Monthly or bimonthly injections resulted in significantly reduced LDL-C at week 12.

The Phase 3 SPIRE trials were dose-finding studies and found bococizumab to significantly reduce LDL cholesterol levels, but was commonly associated with anti-drug antibodies. The development of anti-drug antibodies with bococizumab led to an attenuation in LDL lowering at 52 weeks. Wide variation in the relative reduction in cholesterol levels was additionally observed among those not developing antidrug antibodies. After assessing the data, Pfizer abandoned further development of bococizumab.
