= ABCG5 =

Protein-coding gene in humans

Identifiers
- Aliases: ABCG5, STSL, ATP binding cassette subfamily G member 5, STSL2
- External IDs: OMIM: 605459; MGI: 1351659; GeneCards: ABCG5
Available structures
| PDB | Ortholog search: PDBe RCSB |
| PDB | List of PDB id codes 5DO7 |

Gene location (Human)
| Chr. | Chromosome 2 (human) |
| Band | 2p21 | Start | 43,812,472 bp |
| Band | 2p21 | End | 43,838,865 bp |

Gene location (Mouse)
| Chr. | Chromosome 17 (mouse) |
| Band | 17 E4|17 55.02 cM | Start | 84,965,662 bp |
| Band | 17 E4|17 55.02 cM | End | 84,990,439 bp |
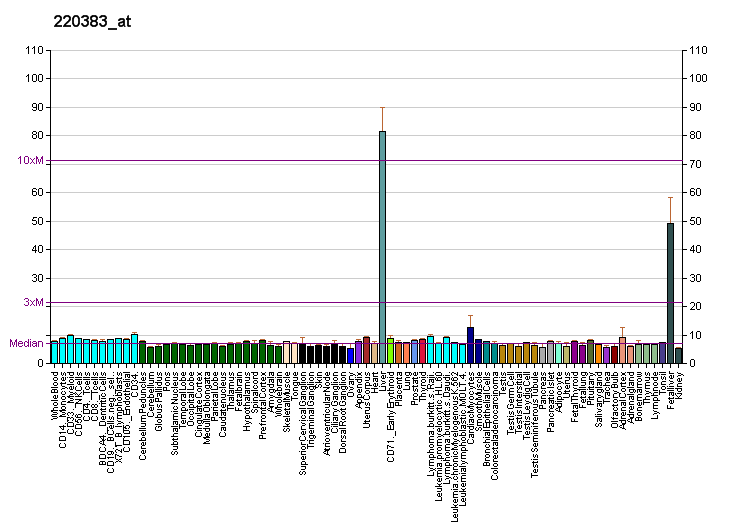
RNA expression pattern
| Bgee | Human / Mouse (ortholog); Top expressed in: jejunal mucosa; right lobe of liver; duodenum; mucosa of ileum; gallbladder; gonad; prefrontal cortex; Brodmann area 9; islet of Langerhans; kidney / Top expressed in: intestinal villus; jejunum; duodenum; ileum; epithelium of small intestine; crypt of lieberkuhn of small intestine; left lobe of liver; choroidal fissure; Paneth cell; left colon; More reference expression data |
| BioGPS | More reference expression data |
Gene ontology
| Molecular function | nucleotide binding; ATPase activity; protein binding; ATP binding; cholesterol transfer activity; protein heterodimerization activity; ATPase-coupled transmembrane transporter activity; metal ion binding; xenobiotic transmembrane transporter activity |
| Cellular component | integral component of membrane; membrane; ATP-binding cassette (ABC) transporter complex; receptor complex; apical part of cell; plasma membrane; integral component of plasma membrane; apical plasma membrane |
| Biological process | response to ionizing radiation; excretion; response to nutrient; negative regulation of intestinal phytosterol absorption; intestinal cholesterol absorption; negative regulation of intestinal cholesterol absorption; cholesterol homeostasis; xenobiotic transmembrane transport; lipid transport; cholesterol efflux; transmembrane transport |
Sources:Amigo / QuickGO
Orthologs
| Databases | NCBI: entry; OMA: entry |
| Species | Human | Mouse |
| Entrez | 64240 | 27409 |
| Ensembl | ENSG00000138075 | ENSMUSG00000040505 |
| UniProt | Q9H222 | Q99PE8 |
| RefSeq (mRNA) | NM_022436 | NM_031884 |
| RefSeq (protein) | NP_071881 | NP_114090 |
| Location (UCSC) | Chr 2: 43.81 – 43.84 Mb | Chr 17: 84.97 – 84.99 Mb |
| PubMed search |
- Wikidata
| View/Edit Human | View/Edit Mouse |

ATP-binding cassette sub-family G member 5 is a protein that in humans is encoded by the ABCG5 gene.

== Function ==
The protein encoded by this gene is a member of the superfamily of ATP-binding cassette (ABC) transporters. ABC proteins transport various molecules across extra- and intra-cellular membranes. ABC genes are divided into seven distinct subfamilies (ABC1, MDR/TAP, MRP, ALD, OABP, GCN20, White). This protein is a member of the White subfamily. The protein encoded by this gene functions as a half-transporter to limit intestinal absorption and promote biliary excretion of sterols. It is expressed in a tissue-specific manner in the liver, colon, and intestine. This gene is tandemly arrayed on chromosome 2, in a head-to-head orientation with family member ABCG8. Mutations in this gene may contribute to sterol accumulation and atherosclerosis, and have been observed in patients with sitosterolemia.

== Interactive pathway map ==
Click on genes, proteins and metabolites below to link to respective articles. (Note: The interactive pathway map can be edited at WikiPathways: "Statin_Pathway_WP430".)

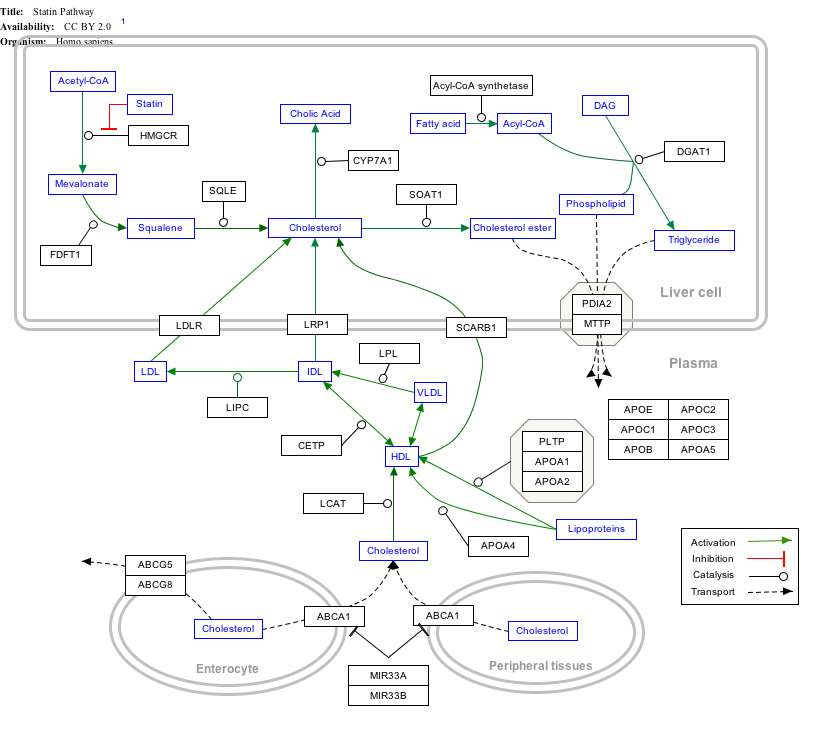

Statin pathway edit

== See also ==
- ABCG5 and ABCG8 Genes
