= PCSK9 =

Mammalian protein found in humans

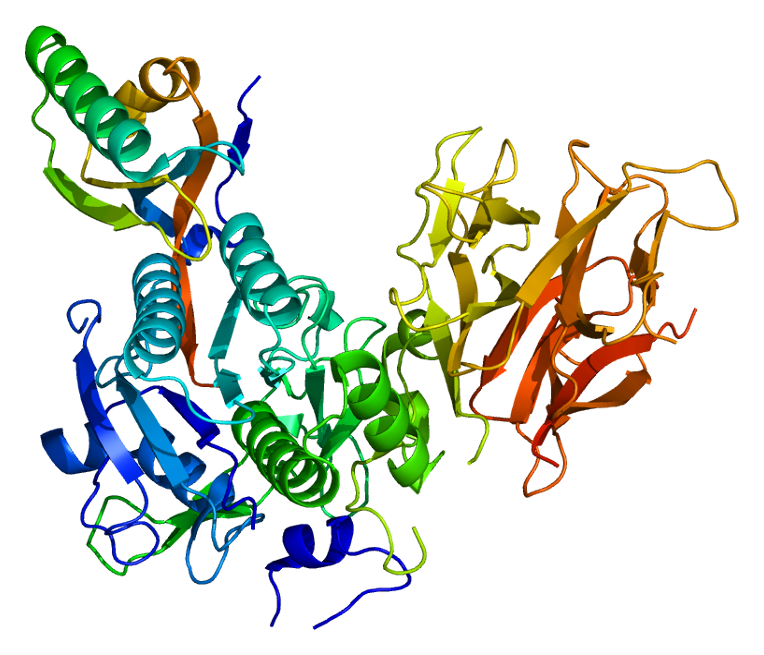

Identifiers
- Aliases: PCSK9, proprotein convertase subtilisin/kexin type 9, FH3, HCHOLA3, LDLCQ1, NARC-1, NARC1, PC9, FHCL3
- External IDs: OMIM: 607786; MGI: 2140260; GeneCards: PCSK9
Available structures
PDB	Ortholog search: PDBe RCSB
PDB	List of PDB id codes 2P4E, 2PMW, 2QTW, 2W2M, 2W2N, 2W2O, 2W2P, 2W2Q, 2XTJ, 3BPS, 3GCW, 3GCX, 3H42, 3M0C, 3P5B, 3P5C, 3SQO, 4K8R, 4NE9, 4NMX, 4OV6

Gene location (Human)
Chr.	Chromosome 1 (human)
Band	1p32.3	Start	55,039,447 bp
Band	1p32.3	End	55,064,852 bp

Gene location (Mouse)
Chr.	Chromosome 4 (mouse)
Band	4|4 C7	Start	106,299,526 bp
Band	4|4 C7	End	106,321,526 bp
RNA expression pattern
Bgee	Human / Mouse (ortholog); Top expressed in: right lobe of liver; mucosa of transverse colon; testicle; cerebellar hemisphere; right hemisphere of cerebellum; secondary oocyte; upper lobe of left lung; gonad; right lung; mucosa of ileum / Top expressed in: epithelium of small intestine; migratory enteric neural crest cell; renal calyx; midgut; Hindgut; liver; Paneth cell; anal canal; ileum; lobe of liver; More reference expression data
BioGPS	n/a
Gene ontology
Molecular function	apolipoprotein binding; apolipoprotein receptor binding; very-low-density lipoprotein particle binding; low-density lipoprotein particle binding; protein self-association; sodium channel inhibitor activity; low-density lipoprotein particle receptor binding; very-low-density lipoprotein particle receptor binding; peptidase activity; protein binding; serine-type peptidase activity; signaling receptor inhibitor activity; serine-type endopeptidase activity; hydrolase activity; RNA binding
Cellular component	cytoplasm; endosome; late endosome; rough endoplasmic reticulum; Golgi apparatus; plasma membrane; PCSK9-AnxA2 complex; cell surface; early endosome; extrinsic component of external side of plasma membrane; endoplasmic reticulum; perinuclear region of cytoplasm; COPII-coated ER to Golgi transport vesicle; lysosome; PCSK9-LDLR complex; extracellular region; extracellular space; lysosomal membrane; endolysosome membrane; endoplasmic reticulum lumen
Biological process	lipoprotein metabolic process; neurogenesis; steroid metabolic process; kidney development; positive regulation of receptor internalization; lipid metabolism; negative regulation of low-density lipoprotein particle clearance; negative regulation of sodium ion transmembrane transporter activity; regulation of low-density lipoprotein particle receptor catabolic process; cellular response to starvation; regulation of neuron apoptotic process; protein processing; regulation of signaling receptor activity; cholesterol metabolic process; protein autoprocessing; proteolysis; positive regulation of neuron apoptotic process; positive regulation of low-density lipoprotein particle receptor catabolic process; low-density lipoprotein receptor particle metabolic process; neuron differentiation; cellular response to insulin stimulus; lysosomal transport; phospholipid metabolic process; liver development; cholesterol homeostasis; triglyceride metabolic process; negative regulation of receptor recycling; apoptotic process; negative regulation of low-density lipoprotein particle receptor binding; negative regulation of low-density lipoprotein receptor activity; negative regulation of receptor-mediated endocytosis involved in cholesterol transport; low-density lipoprotein particle receptor catabolic process; low-density lipoprotein particle clearance; post-translational protein modification; negative regulation of signaling receptor activity
Sources:Amigo / QuickGO
Orthologs
Databases	NCBI: entry; OMA: entry
Species	Human	Mouse
Entrez	255738	100102
Ensembl	ENSG00000169174	ENSMUSG00000044254
UniProt	Q8NBP7	Q80W65
RefSeq (mRNA)	NM_174936	NM_153565
RefSeq (protein)	NP_777596	NP_705793
Location (UCSC)	Chr 1: 55.04 – 55.06 Mb	Chr 4: 106.3 – 106.32 Mb
PubMed search
- Wikidata
View/Edit Human	View/Edit Mouse

Proprotein convertase subtilisin/kexin type 9 (PCSK9) is an enzyme encoded by the PCSK9 gene in humans on chromosome 1. It is the 9th member of the proprotein convertase family of proteins that activate other proteins. Similar genes (orthologs) are found across many species. As with many proteins, PCSK9 is inactive when first synthesized, because a section of peptide chains blocks their activity; proprotein convertases remove that section to activate the enzyme. The PCSK9 gene also contains one of 27 loci associated with increased risk of coronary artery disease.

PCSK9 is ubiquitously expressed in many tissues and cell types. PCSK9 binds to and degrades the receptor for low-density lipoprotein particles (LDL), which typically transport 3,000 to 6,000 fat molecules (including cholesterol) per particle, within extracellular fluid. The LDL receptor (LDLR), on liver and other cell membranes, binds and initiates ingestion of LDL-particles from extracellular fluid into cells and targets the complex to lysosomes for destruction. If PCSK9 is blocked, the LDL-LDLR complex separates during trafficking, with the LDL digested in the lysosome, but the LDLRs instead recycled back to the cell surface and so able to remove additional LDL-particles from the extracellular fluid. Therefore, blocking PCSK9 can lower blood LDL-particle concentrations.

PCSK9 has medical importance because it acts in lipoprotein homeostasis. Agents that block PCSK9 can lower LDL particle concentrations. The first two PCSK9 inhibitors, alirocumab and evolocumab, were approved as once every two week injections, by the U.S. Food and Drug Administration in 2015 for lowering LDL-particle concentrations when statins and other drugs were not sufficiently effective or poorly tolerated. While these medications are prescribed by many physicians, the payment for prescriptions are often denied by insurance providers. As a result, pharmaceutical manufacturers lowered the prices of these drugs.

== Structure ==
=== Gene ===
The PCSK9 gene resides on chromosome 1 at the band 1p32.3 and includes 15 exons. This gene produces two isoforms through alternative splicing.

=== Protein ===
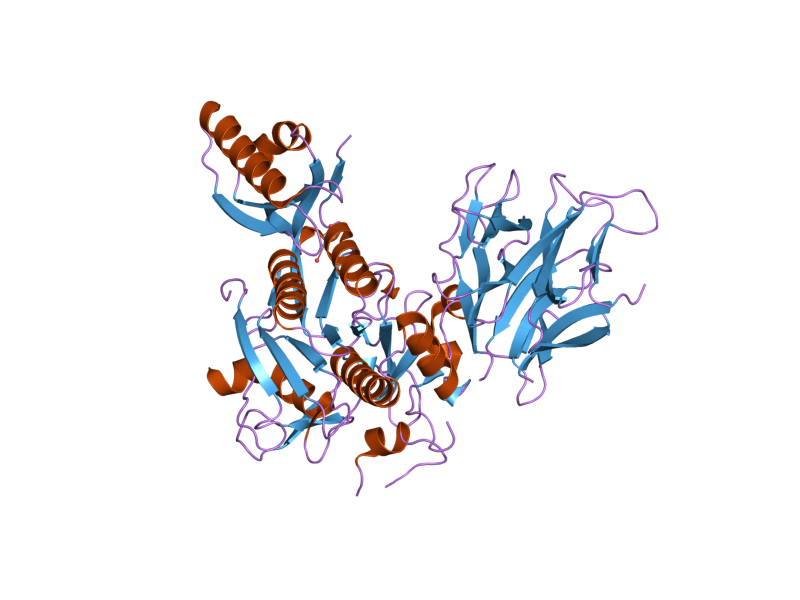
Crystal structure of PCSK9 (PDB: 2P4E)

PCSK9 is a member of the peptidase S8 family.

The solved structure of PCSK9 reveals four major components in the pre-processed protein: the signal peptide (residues 1-30); the N-terminal prodomain (residues 31–152); the catalytic domain (residues 153–425); and the C-terminal domain (residues 426–692), which is further divided into three modules. The N-terminal prodomain has a flexible crystal structure and is responsible for regulating PCSK9 function by interacting with and blocking the catalytic domain, which otherwise binds the epidermal growth factor-like repeat A (EGF-A) domain of the LDLR. While previous studies indicated that the C-terminal domain was uninvolved in binding LDLR, a recent study by Du et al. demonstrated that the C-terminal domain does bind LDLR. The secretion of PCSK9 is largely dependent on the autocleavage of the signal peptide and N-terminal prodomain, though the N-terminal prodomain retains its association with the catalytic domain. In particular, residues 61–70 in the N-terminal prodomain are crucial for its autoprocessing.

== Function ==
=== Synthesis ===
PCSK9 is synthesized as a soluble zymogen that undergoes autocatalytic intramolecular processing in the endoplasmic reticulum. It is expressed mainly in liver, intestine, kidney, skin and the central nervous system. After being processed in the ER, PCSK9 co-localizes with the protein sortilin on its way through the Golgi and trans-Golgi complex. A PCSK9-sortilin interaction is proposed to be required for cellular secretion of PCSK9. In healthy humans, plasma PCSK9 levels directly correlate with plasma sortilin levels, following a diurnal rhythm similar to cholesterol synthesis. The plasma PCSK9 concentration is higher in women compared to men, and the PCSK9 concentrations decrease with age in men but increase in women, suggesting that estrogen level most likely plays a role. PCSK9 gene expression can be regulated by sterol-response element binding proteins (SREBP-1/2), which also controls LDLR expression.

=== Cholesterol homeostasis ===
As a negative post-translational regulator of the low-density lipoprotein receptor (LDLR), PCSK9 plays a major role in cholesterol homeostasis. Upon binding of low-density lipoprotein (LDL) cholesterol to the LDL receptor, the resulting LDLR-LDL complex is internalized. When exposed to the acidic environment within the resulting endosome LDLR adopts a hairpin conformation. This conformational change in turn induces the dissociation of the LDL-LDLR complex, allowing LDLR to be recycled back to the plasma membrane. Binding of PCSK9 to cell surface LDLR (through the LDLR EGF-A domain) also induces LDLR internalization. However, unlike LDL binding, PCSK9 prevents LDLR from undergoing a conformational change. This inhibition redirects LDLR to a lysosome where it is degraded. Thus, PCSK9 lowers cell surface expression of LDLR and thereby decreases metabolism of LDL-particles, which in turn may lead to hypercholesterolemia. PCSK9 also plays an important role in triglyceride-rich apoB lipoprotein production in small intestine and postprandial lipemia.

=== Skin and inflammation ===
ApoB lipoprotein, PCSK9, and the genes involved in cholesterol synthesis are highly expressed in the epidermis. The cutaneous expression of PCSK9 is likely important for proper skin barrier formation as ceramides, free fatty acids, and cholesterol are the three major components of the epidermal lipid barrier. Matching its function in cholesterol homeostasis, there is a gradient of PCSK9 expression in the epidermis. PCSK9 is selectively expressed in basal and spinous layer keratinocytes with little to no expression in granular layer keratinocytes. In contrast to basal layer keratinocytes, granular layer keratinocytes release large amounts of cholesterol and other lipids to form a lipid rich "mortar" in the intracellular space between keratinocytes. In addition to its likely role in epidermal lipid barrier formation, PCSK9 has also been linked to skin inflammation. For example, genetic variants of PCSK9 have been linked psoriasis, and knockdown expression of PCSK9 in keratinocytes results in increase expression of IL-36G and other keratinocyte-derived inflammatory mediators.

=== Differentiation ===
PCSK9 may also have a role in the differentiation of cortical neurons.

== Clinical significance ==
Variants of PCSK9 can reduce or increase circulating cholesterol. LDL-particles are removed from the blood when they bind to LDLR on the surface of cells, including liver cells, and are taken inside the cells. When PCSK9 binds to an LDLR, the receptor is destroyed along with the LDL particle. PCSK9 degrades LDLR by preventing the hairpin conformational change of LDLR. If PCSK9 does not bind, the receptor will return to the surface of the cell and can continue to remove LDL-particles from the bloodstream.

Other variants are associated with a rare autosomal dominant familial hypercholesterolemia (HCHOLA3). The mutations increase its protease activity, reducing LDLR levels and preventing the uptake of cholesterol into the cells.

In humans, PCSK9 was initially discovered as a protein expressed in the brain. However, it has also been described in the kidney, the pancreas, liver and small intestine. Recent evidence indicate that PCSK9 is highly expressed in arterial walls such as endothelium, smooth muscle cells, and macrophages, with a local effect that can regulate vascular homeostasis and atherosclerosis. Accordingly, it is now very clear that PCSK9 has pro-atherosclerotic effects and regulates lipoprotein synthesis.

As PCSK9 binds to LDLR, which prevents the removal of LDL-particles from the blood plasma, several studies have determined the potential use of PCSK9 inhibitors in the treatment of hyperlipoproteinemia (commonly called hypercholesterolemia). Furthermore, loss-of-function mutations in the PCSK9 gene result in lower levels of LDL and protection against cardiovascular disease.

In addition to its lipoprotein synthetic and pro-atherosclerotic effects, PCSK9 is involved in glucose metabolism and obesity, regulation of re-absorption of sodium in the kidney which is relevant in hypertension. Furthermore, PCSK9 may be involved in bacterial or viral infections and sepsis. In the brain the role of PCSK9 is still controversial and may be either pro-apoptotic or protective in the development of the nervous system. PCSK9 levels have been detected in the cerebrospinal fluid at a 50–60 times lower level than in serum.

=== Biomarker ===
A multi-locus genetic risk score study based on a combination of 27 loci including the PCSK9 gene, identified individuals at increased risk for both incident and recurrent coronary artery disease events, as well as an enhanced clinical benefit from statin therapy. The study was based on a community cohort study (the Malmo Diet and Cancer study) and four additional randomized controlled trials of primary prevention cohorts (JUPITER and ASCOT) and secondary prevention cohorts (CARE and PROVE IT-TIMI 22).

== As a drug target ==
=== Monoclonal antibody therapeutics ===
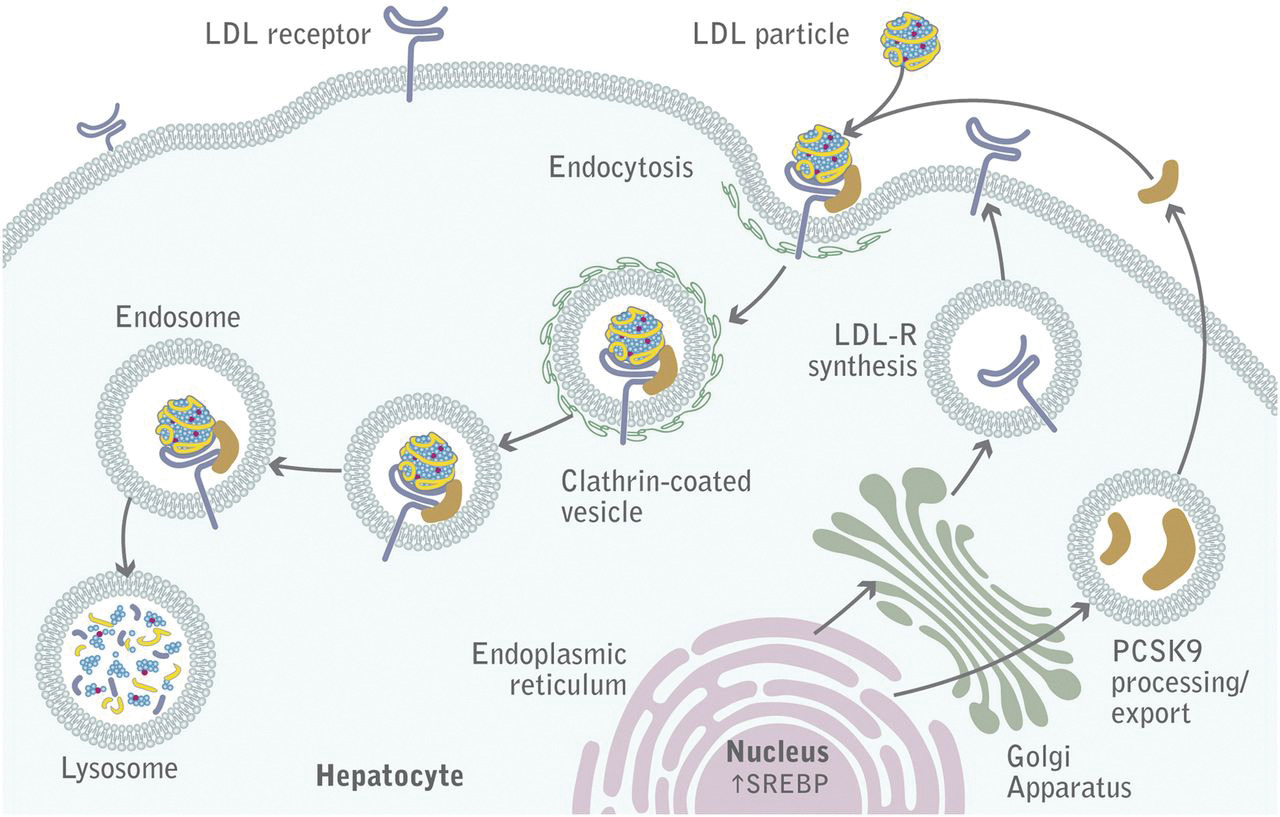
Under normal conditions, PCSK9 binds to the LDL-LDLR-complex and directs both to the lysosome for degradation.

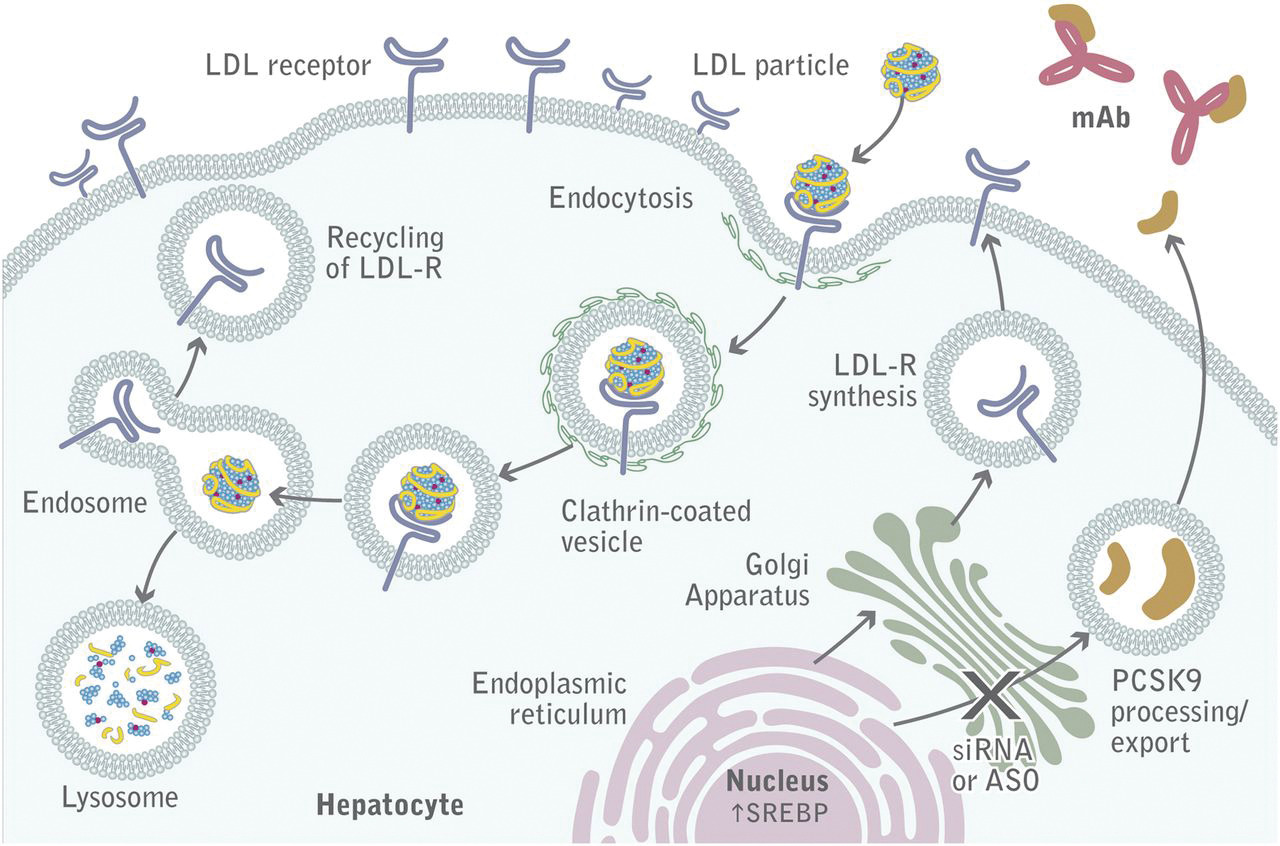
PCSK9-inhibitors that prevent the association between PCSK9 and the LDLR mean that when LDLR is internalised, it releases the LDL before reaching the lysosome and is instead recycled to the cell surface to be available for binding again.

Several studies have determined the potential use of PCSK9 inhibitors in the treatment of hyperlipoproteinemia (commonly called hypercholesterolemia). Furthermore, loss-of-function mutations in the PCSK9 gene result in lower levels of LDL and protection against cardiovascular disease.

Drugs can inhibit PCSK9, leading to lowered circulating LDL particle concentrations. Since LDL particle concentrations are thought by many experts to be a driver of cardiovascular disease like heart attacks, it is plausible that these drugs may also reduce the risk of such diseases. Clinical studies, including phase III clinical trials, are now underway to describe the effect of PCSK9 inhibition on cardiovascular disease, and the safety and efficacy profile of the drugs. Among those inhibitors under development in December 2013 were the antibodies alirocumab, evolocumab, 1D05-IgG2 (Merck), RG-7652 and LY3015014, as well as the RNAi therapeutic inclisiran. PCSK9 inhibitors are promising therapeutics for the treatment of people who exhibit statin intolerance, or as a way to bypass frequent dosage of statins for higher LDL concentration reduction.

A review published in 2015 concluded that these agents, when used in patients with high LDL-particle concentrations (thus at greatly elevated risk for cardiovascular disease) seem to be safe and effective at reducing all-cause mortality, cardiovascular mortality, and heart attacks. However a 2020 review concluded that while PCSK9 inhibitor treatment provides additional benefits beyond maximally tolerated statin therapy in high-risk individuals, PCSK9 inhibitor use probably produces little or no difference in mortality.

Regeneron Pharmaceuticals (in collaboration with Sanofi) became the first to market a PCSK9 inhibitor, with a competitor Amgen reaching market slightly later. Prices were very high, inhibiting adoption. The drugs are approved by the FDA for treatment of hypercholesterolemia, notably the genetic condition heterozygous familial hypercholesterolemia which causes high cholesterol levels and heart attacks at a young age. These drugs were later approved by the FDA for the reduction of cardiovascular events including a reduction in all-cause mortality.

In recent meta-analyses, early initiation of PCSK9 inhibitors within 48 to 72 hours following acute coronary syndrome (ACS) in addition to high dose statin therapy was associated with rapid reduction in LDL-C level, and potentially other lipid profiles such as triglycerides and total cholesterol level at 4 to 12 weeks after the cardiac event. This translates into a significant reduction in ACS-related hospital readmission and the need for coronary revascularization in short-term follow-up at 1 to 18 months.

Two monoclonal antibodies that bind to and inhibit PCSK9 near the catalytic domain have since been approved to lower LDL cholesterol: alirocumab (Praluent, Sanofi/Regeneron), approved by the U.S. Food and Drug Administration (FDA) on 24 July 2015, and evolocumab (Repatha, Amgen), approved on 27 August 2015; both were also authorised in the European Union in 2015. Inclisiran (Leqvio, Novartis), a small interfering RNA (siRNA) that reduces PCSK9 production in the liver and is administered by twice-yearly injection, was subsequently approved by the European Medicines Agency in December 2020 and by the FDA in December 2021. PCSK9 inhibitors have been shown to significantly reduce LDL-C levels and increase HDL-C levels significantly. They were found to lower the incidence of myocardial infarction and stroke in individuals at high cardiovascular risk (over 15% using PREDICT cardiovascular disease calculator), such as those with at least five risk factors, established cardiovascular disease, or hereditary lipid disorders without cardiovascular risk factor, but not in those at low to moderate risk. A 2023 meta-analysis has indicated that alirocumab may reduce all-cause mortality, whereas evolocumab has no significant effect on all-cause mortality. The efficacy of bococizumab remains unclear, as its development was discontinued by Pfizer in 2016. The most recent guidelines for cholesterol management from the American Heart Association and American College of Cardiology now provide guidance for when PCSK9 inhibitors should be considered, particularly focusing on cases in which maximally tolerated statin and ezetimibe fail to achieve goal LDL reduction.

A possible side effect of the monoclonal antibody might be irritation at the injection site. Before the infusions, participants received oral corticosteroids, histamine receptor blockers, and acetaminophen to reduce the risk of infusion-related reactions, which by themselves will cause several side effects.

=== CRISPR ===
STX-1150 is a potential CRISPR-based treatment for hypercholesterolemia. STX-1150 is a liver-targeted therapy designed to silence PCSK9 via a durable epigenetic mark and durably reduce low-density lipoprotein cholesterol (LDL-C) without DNA changes. In non-human primate tests, it reduced LDL-C by >50% and was effective for ~18 months following a single administration.

==== Adverse effects ====
An FDA warning in March 2014 about possible cognitive adverse effects of PCSK9 inhibition caused concern, as the FDA asked companies to include neurocognitive testing into their Phase III clinical trials.

=== Peptide mimics ===
Peptides that bind extra-cellular PCSK9 have been explored as potential PCSK9 inhibitors in preclinical studies. One of these, Merck's enlicitide decanoate (formerly known as MK-0616), was approved for medical use in the United States in July 2026. According to one reviewer, it "promises to be a blockbuster cholesterol-lowering drug".

=== Gene silencing ===
The PCSK9 antisense oligonucleotide increases expression of the LDLR and decreases circulating total cholesterol levels in mice. A locked nucleic acid reduced PCSK9 mRNA levels in mice. Initial clinical trials showed positive results of ALN-PCS, which acts by means of RNA interference.

In 2021, scientists demonstrated that CRISPR gene editing can decrease blood levels of LDL cholesterol in vivo in Macaca fascicularis monkeys for months by 60% via knockdown of PCSK9 in the liver.

In 2023, a clinical trial demonstrated that VERVE-101 gene therapy, which works via CRISPR gene editing, could reduce LDL cholesterol by as much as 55% in human volunteers with heterozygous familial hypercholesterolemia.

=== Vaccination ===
A vaccine that targets PCSK9 has been developed to treat high LDL-particle concentrations. The vaccine uses a VLP (virus-like particle) as an immunogenic carrier of an antigenic PCSK9 peptide. VLPs consist of the outer shell of a virus particle but lack a viral genome and are unable to replicate; they can induce immune responses without causing infection. Mice and macaques vaccinated with bacteriophage VLPs displaying PCSK9-derived peptides developed high-titer IgG antibodies that bound to circulating PCSK9. Vaccination was associated with significant reductions in total cholesterol, free cholesterol, phospholipids, and triglycerides.

=== Naturally occurring inhibitors ===
The plant alkaloid berberine inhibits the transcription of the PCSK9 gene in immortalized human hepatocytes in vitro, and lowers serum PCSK9 in mice and hamsters in vivo. It has been speculated that this action contributes to the ability of berberine to lower serum cholesterol. Annexin A2, an endogenous protein, is a natural inhibitor of PCSK9 activity.

== History ==
In February 2003, Nabil Seidah and Jae Byun, a scientist at the Clinical Research Institute of Montreal in Canada, discovered a novel human proprotein convertase, the gene for which was located on the short arm of chromosome 1. Meanwhile, a lab led by Catherine Boileau at the Necker–Enfants Malades Hospital in Paris had been following families with familial hypercholesterolaemia, a genetic condition that, in 90% of cases causes coronary artery disease (FRAMINGHAM study) and in 60% of cases may lead to an early death; they had identified a mutation on chromosome 1 carried by some of these families, but had been unable to identify the relevant gene. The labs got together and by the end of the year published their work, linking mutations in the gene, now identified as PCSK9, to the condition. In their paper, they speculated that the mutations might make the gene overactive. In that same year, investigators at Rockefeller University and University of Texas Southwestern had discovered the same protein in mice, and had worked out the novel pathway that regulates LDL cholesterol in which PCSK9 is involved, and it soon became clear that the mutations identified in France led to excessive PCSK9 activity, and thus excessive removal of the LDL receptor, leaving people carrying the mutations with too much LDL cholesterol. Meanwhile, Helen H. Hobbs and Jonathan Cohen at UT-Southwestern had been studying people with very high and very low cholesterol, and had been collecting DNA samples. With the new knowledge about the role of PCSK9 and its location in the genome, they sequenced the relevant region of chromosome 1 in people with very low cholesterol and they found nonsense mutations in the gene, thus validating PCSK9 as a biological target for drug discovery.

In July 2015, the FDA approved the first PCSK9 Inhibitor drugs for medical use.
