= National Cholesterol Education Program =

The National Cholesterol Education Program is a program managed by the National Heart, Lung and Blood Institute, a division of the National Institutes of Health. Its goal is to reduce increased cardiovascular disease rates due to hypercholesterolemia (elevated cholesterol levels) in the United States of America. The program has been running since 1985.

The assigned goal of the NCEP committee is to meet on a recurring basis, review ongoing scientific research about atherosclerotic cardiovascular disease and make simplified, consensus, committee recommendations to be promoted by the NIH, the American Heart Association and other groups to both physicians and the public about how to reduce the incidence of disability and death resulting from atherosclerotic cardiovascular disease.
