= Low-density lipoprotein receptor adapter protein 1 =

Protein found in humans

LDLRAP1
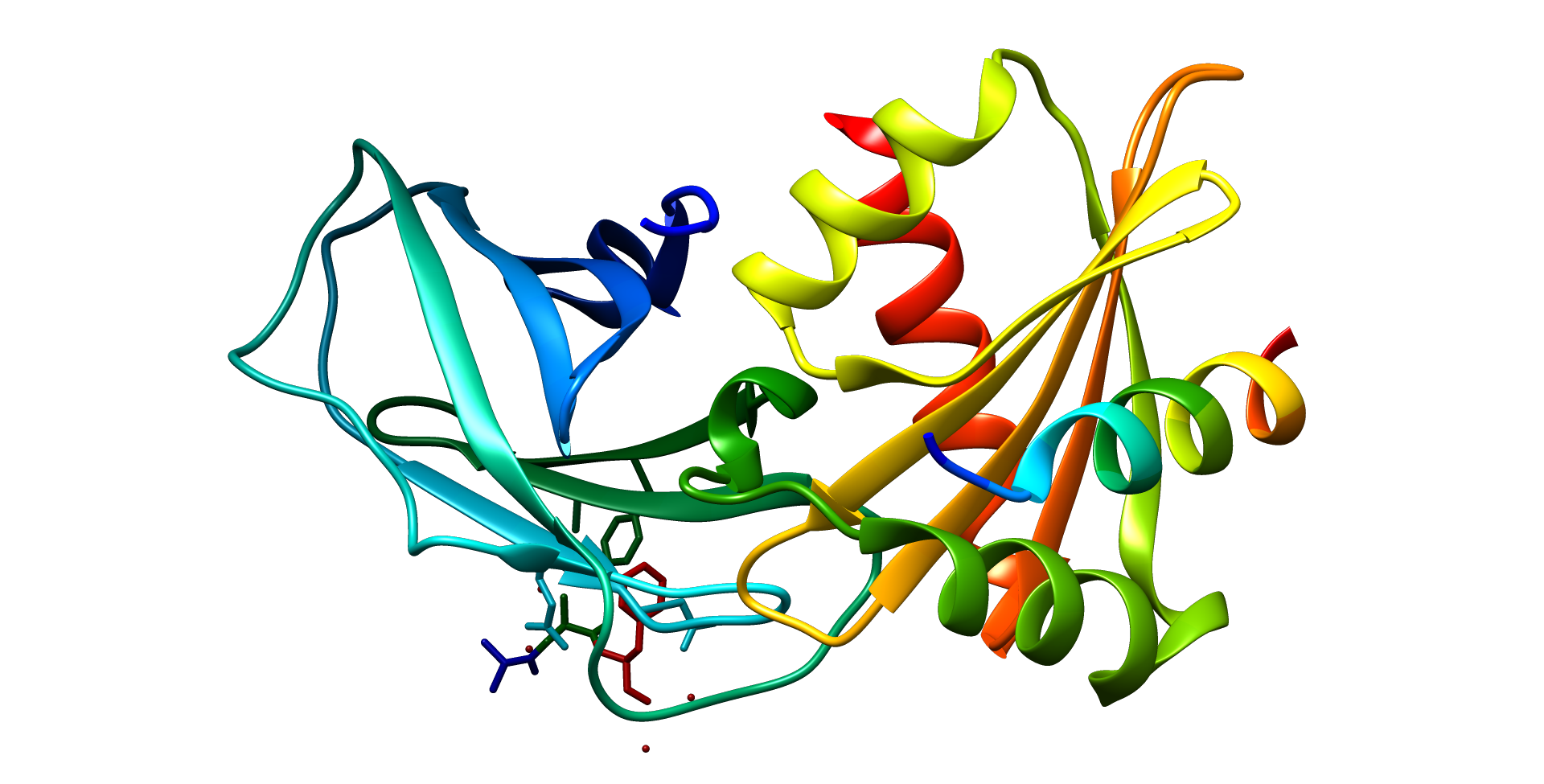

Identifiers
- Aliases: LDLRAP1, ARH, ARH1, ARH2, FHCB1, FHCB2, low density lipoprotein receptor adaptor protein 1, FHCL4
- External IDs: OMIM: 605747; MGI: 2140175; GeneCards: LDLRAP1
Available structures
PDB	Ortholog search: PDBe RCSB
PDB	List of PDB id codes 2G30

Gene location (Human)
Chr.	Chromosome 1 (human)
Band	1p36.11	Start	25,543,606 bp
Band	1p36.11	End	25,568,886 bp

Gene location (Mouse)
Chr.	Chromosome 4 (mouse)
Band	4|4 D3	Start	134,468,865 bp
Band	4|4 D3	End	134,495,335 bp
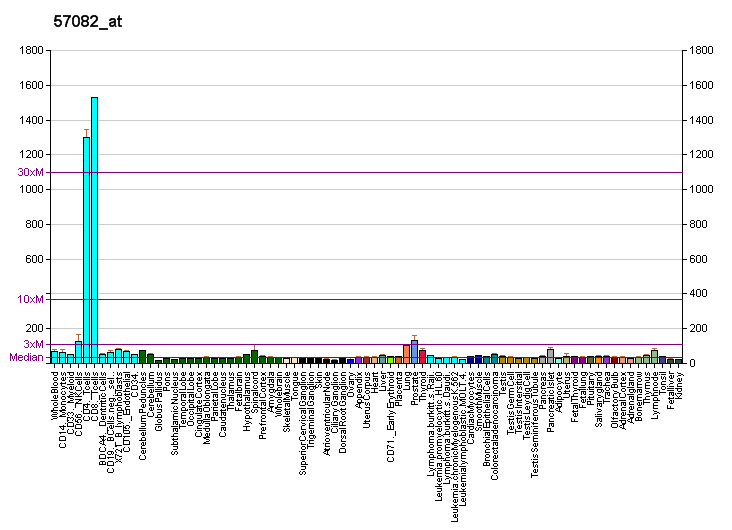

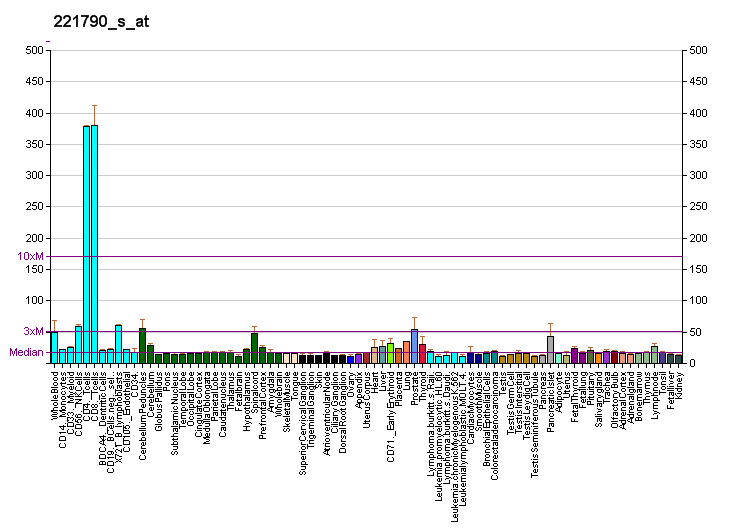
RNA expression pattern
Bgee	Human / Mouse (ortholog); Top expressed in: cerebellar hemisphere; right hemisphere of cerebellum; C1 segment; granulocyte; spleen; endothelial cell; lymph node; body of pancreas; hair follicle; islet of Langerhans / Top expressed in: otic vesicle; saccule; otic placode; granulocyte; molar; lip; lumbar subsegment of spinal cord; tibiofemoral joint; conjunctival fornix; calvaria; More reference expression data
BioGPS	More reference expression data
Gene ontology
Molecular function	AP-2 adaptor complex binding; clathrin adaptor activity; phosphotyrosine residue binding; clathrin binding; amyloid-beta binding; signaling adaptor activity; low-density lipoprotein particle receptor binding; protein binding; phosphatidylinositol-4,5-bisphosphate binding; signaling receptor complex adaptor activity; AP-1 adaptor complex binding
Cellular component	cytoplasm; AP-1 adaptor complex; recycling endosome; cytosol; basal plasma membrane; cytoplasmic side of plasma membrane; AP-2 adaptor complex; neurofilament; axon; early endosome; plasma membrane; clathrin-coated vesicle membrane
Biological process	positive regulation of receptor-mediated endocytosis; steroid metabolic process; endocytosis; receptor-mediated endocytosis involved in cholesterol transport; lipid metabolism; receptor internalization; amyloid precursor protein metabolic process; receptor-mediated endocytosis; positive regulation of cholesterol metabolic process; cholesterol homeostasis; regulation of protein binding; cholesterol metabolic process; positive regulation of signal transduction; low-density lipoprotein particle clearance; membrane organization; positive regulation of receptor-mediated endocytosis involved in cholesterol transport; regulation of protein localization to plasma membrane; cholesterol transport; cellular response to cytokine stimulus; positive regulation of vascular associated smooth muscle cell proliferation; positive regulation of low-density lipoprotein particle clearance
Sources:Amigo / QuickGO
Orthologs
Databases	NCBI: entry; OMA: entry
Species	Human	Mouse
Entrez	26119	100017
Ensembl	ENSG00000157978	ENSMUSG00000037295
UniProt	Q5SW96	Q8C142
RefSeq (mRNA)	NM_015627	NM_145554
RefSeq (protein)	NP_056442	NP_663529
Location (UCSC)	Chr 1: 25.54 – 25.57 Mb	Chr 4: 134.47 – 134.5 Mb
PubMed search
- Wikidata
View/Edit Human	View/Edit Mouse

Low-density lipoprotein receptor adapter protein 1 is a protein that in humans is encoded by the LDLRAP1 gene.

The protein encoded by this gene is a cytosolic protein which contains a phosphotyrosine binding (PTB) domain. The PTB domain has been found to interact with the cytoplasmic tail of the LDL receptor. Mutations in this gene lead to LDL receptor malfunction and cause the disorder autosomal recessive hypercholesterolaemia.

== Interactions ==
LDLRAP1 has been shown to interact with AP2B1 and LRP2.
