= Evolocumab =

Pharmaceutical drug

Monoclonal antibody
- Type: Whole antibody
- Source: Human
- Target: PCSK9

Clinical data
- Pronunciation: e-voe-LOK-ue-mab
- Trade names: Repatha
- Other names: AMG-145
- AHFS/Drugs.com: Monograph
- License data: US DailyMed: Evolocumab
- Pregnancy category: AU: B1
- Routes of administration: Subcutaneous
- ATC code: C10AX13 (WHO)

Legal status
- Legal status: AU: S4 (Prescription only); CA: ℞-only; US: ℞-only; EU: Rx-only; In general: ℞ (Prescription only)

Identifiers
- CAS Number: 1256937-27-5
- ChemSpider: none
- UNII: LKC0U3A8NJ
- KEGG: D10557

Chemical and physical data
- Formula: C_{6242}H_{9648}N_{1668}O_{1996}S_{56}
- Molar mass: 141790.89 g·mol^{−1}

Evolocumab, sold under the brand name Repatha, is a monoclonal antibody drug. It is an immunotherapy medication for the treatment of hyperlipidemia.

Evolocumab inhibits proprotein convertase subtilisin/kexin type 9 (PCSK9). PCSK9 is a protein that targets LDL receptors for degradation; its inhibition enhances the liver's ability to remove LDL-C, the "bad" cholesterol, from the blood.

In 2023, it was the 188th most commonly prescribed medication in the United States, with more than 2 million prescriptions.

== Mechanism ==
Evolocumab binds to PCSK9 and inhibits it from binding to LDL receptors on the liver surface. In the absence of PCSK9, more LDL receptors are available on the surface of liver cells to remove LDL-C from the blood.

== Adverse effects ==
Injection site reactions such as redness and pain are reported in approximately 2.1–4.3% of cases.

== History ==
=== Patent dispute ===
Regeneron Pharmaceuticals and Amgen each filed for US patent protection on their monoclonal antibodies against PCSK9, leading to patent litigation. In March 2016, a district court found that Regeneron's drug alirocumab infringed Amgen's patents; Amgen then requested an injunction barring Regeneron and Sanofi from marketing alirocumab, which was granted in January 2017. After years of litigation, the dispute was docketed by the US Supreme Court which ruled in 2023 that Amgen's patents were invalid. Numerous legal commentators expressed surprise at the decision, given the convention of declining patent case appeals. The question before the Court was "Whether enablement is governed by the statutory requirement, that the specification teach those skilled in the art to "make and use" the claimed invention, or whether it must instead enable those skilled in the art "to reach the full scope of claimed embodiments" without undue experimentation—i.e., to cumulatively identify and make all or nearly all embodiments of the invention without substantial "time and effort". Some commentators claimed that the Court took the case because of the significance of the legal question, which was deemed comparable to the impact of KSR v. Teleflex.

Amgen's patents contained a so-called "functional genus claim", which defines an antibody by its epitope, the specific target against which it binds. Although Amgen did discover the target antigen, antigens cannot be patented, because they are a product of nature (discovered rather than invented). However, Amgen had convinced the patent office to issue a patent that broadly claimed then-unmade antibodies with a high affinity to the discovered antigen. Although such "functional genus" claims presented many problems, lower courts invalidated Amgen's broad claims based on the patent requirements for sufficiency of disclosure. The purposivism justification for disallowing such claims is to allow other companies to develop other (and potentially better) drugs that target the same antigen. However, the drawback of such a narrow interpretation is the resulting reluctance of the antigen discoverers to share their findings with the world, because such early disclosure would reduce their incentives to pursue such discoveries, which they could otherwise obtain by developing multiple medications without disclosure. Such a dilemma is not unique to biologics or to pharmaceuticals, since the purpose of the patent system is to provide an incentive for earlier disclosure along the path from discovery to market.

=== Post-trial ===
Results of the FOURIER trial were published in March 2017. Results from FOURIER-OLE, an open-label follow-up study of 24% of the patients in the treatment arm of FOURIER, were published by Amgen in 2022. In 2022 a reanalysis of the FOURIER trial based on regulatory data reported that cardiac mortality with evolocumab was higher than had been reported in the trial publication. Its authors called for an independent trial restoration of FOURIER. Cardiovascular mortality was reportedly higher on evolocumab than on placebo, although the difference was not statistically significant.

Amgen submitted a biologics license application (BLA) for evolocumab to the FDA in August 2014. It was approved in 2015 in the US, Europe, and Canada.

In 2023, Amgen discontinued the monthly 420 mg dosing option for Repatha, retaining only the biweekly 140 mg option.

== Society and culture ==
=== Economics ===
In 2015, evolocumab cost about US$14,100 per year. One report estimated this to be $400,000 to $500,000 per quality-adjusted life year (QALY), which did not meet "generally accepted" cost-benefit thresholds. The authors calculated that an annual cost of $4,500 would meet an acceptable $100,000 per QALY standard. On 26 October 2018, Amgen announced a 60% cut in price, to $5,850 per year.

In Australia, in April 2025 evolocumab was added to the Pharmaceutical Benefits Scheme (PBS) and is subsidized for qualified patients. The cost to PBS is AUD$339.25 for 2 injectable pens (enough for 4 weeks use = AUD$4420/yr), and the cost to the patient is AUD$31.60 (AUD$416/yr).
