= ABCG8 =

Protein-coding gene in humans

Identifiers
- Aliases: ABCG8, GBD4, STSL, ATP binding cassette subfamily G member 8, STSL1
- External IDs: OMIM: 605460; MGI: 1914720; GeneCards: ABCG8
Available structures
PDB	Ortholog search: PDBe RCSB
PDB	List of PDB id codes 5DO7

Gene location (Human)
Chr.	Chromosome 2 (human)
Band	2p21	Start	43,831,942 bp
Band	2p21	End	43,882,988 bp

Gene location (Mouse)
Chr.	Chromosome 17 (mouse)
Band	17 E4|17 55.02 cM	Start	84,983,730 bp
Band	17 E4|17 55.02 cM	End	85,007,761 bp
RNA expression pattern
Bgee	Human / Mouse (ortholog); Top expressed in: right lobe of liver; jejunal mucosa; duodenum; testicle; secondary oocyte; gallbladder; prefrontal cortex; Brodmann area 9; right frontal lobe; cingulate gyrus / Top expressed in: jejunum; duodenum; intestinal villus; left lobe of liver; ileum; epithelium of small intestine; embryo; tibiofemoral joint; Paneth cell; colon; More reference expression data
BioGPS	n/a
Gene ontology
Molecular function	ATPase activity; protein binding; ATP binding; ATPase-coupled transmembrane transporter activity; metal ion binding; cholesterol transfer activity; protein heterodimerization activity; xenobiotic transmembrane transporter activity; sterol transporter activity
Cellular component	integral component of membrane; membrane; ATP-binding cassette (ABC) transporter complex; plasma membrane; apical plasma membrane; integral component of plasma membrane; receptor complex
Biological process	negative regulation of intestinal phytosterol absorption; intestinal cholesterol absorption; negative regulation of intestinal cholesterol absorption; lipid transport; excretion; cholesterol efflux; cholesterol homeostasis; transmembrane transport; xenobiotic transmembrane transport; response to nutrient; phospholipid transport; sterol transport; sterol homeostasis
Sources:Amigo / QuickGO
Orthologs
Databases	NCBI: entry; OMA: entry
Species	Human	Mouse
Entrez	64241	67470
Ensembl	ENSG00000143921	ENSMUSG00000024254
UniProt	Q9H221	Q9DBM0
RefSeq (mRNA)	NM_022437; NM_001357321	NM_001286005; NM_026180; NM_001347418
RefSeq (protein)	NP_071882; NP_001344250	NP_001272934; NP_001334347; NP_080456
Location (UCSC)	Chr 2: 43.83 – 43.88 Mb	Chr 17: 84.98 – 85.01 Mb
PubMed search
- Wikidata
View/Edit Human	View/Edit Mouse

ATP-binding cassette sub-family G member 8 is a protein that in humans is encoded by the ABCG8 gene.

The protein encoded by this gene is a member of the superfamily of ATP-binding cassette (ABC) transporters. ABC proteins transport various molecules across extra- and intra-cellular membranes. ABC genes are divided into seven distinct subfamilies (ABC1, MDR/TAP, MRP, ALD, OABP, GCN20, White). This protein is a member of the White subfamily. The protein encoded by this gene functions as a half-transporter to limit intestinal absorption and promote biliary excretion of sterols. It is expressed in a tissue-specific manner in the liver, colon, and intestine. This gene is tandemly arrayed on chromosome 2, in a head-to-head orientation with family member ABCG5. Mutations in this gene may contribute to sterol accumulation and atherosclerosis, and have been observed in patients with sitosterolemia.

A loss-of-function mutation in ABCG8 impairs the removal of sterols from cells and, in the homozygous case, leads to sitosterolemia. Heterozygous individuals show slightly increased sterol absorption, normal cholesterol levels, and slightly elevated phytosterol levels.

A gain-of-function SNP rs11887534 increases the likelihood of gallbladder disease, especially cholesterol gallstones. This is probably because more cholesterol is pumped into the bile lumen.

== Interactive pathway map ==
Click on genes, proteins and metabolites below to link to respective articles. (Note: The interactive pathway map can be edited at WikiPathways: "Statin_Pathway_WP430".)

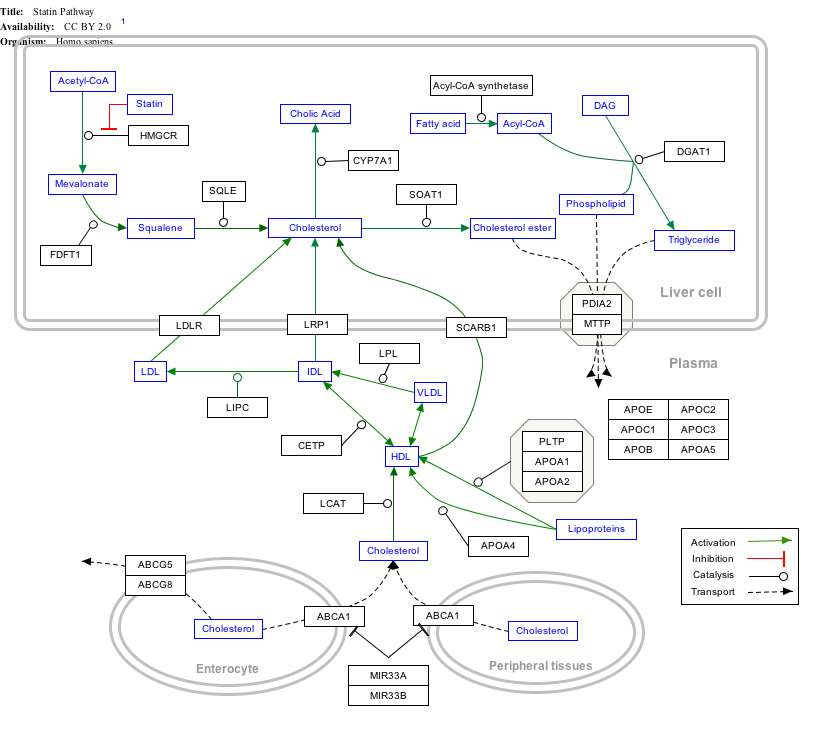

Statin pathway edit

== See also ==
- ATP-binding cassette transporter
