= Bruce Roth =

American organic and medicinal chemist

Bruce D. Roth
- Known for: Discovery and development of atorvastatin (Lipitor)
- Awards: Perkin Medal (2013); ACS Hero of Chemistry (2008); ACS Award for Creative Invention (2003)
- Scientific career
- Fields: Organic chemistry, Medicinal chemistry
- Workplaces: Parke-Davis; Warner-Lambert; Pfizer; Genentech)

Bruce D. Roth is an American organic and medicinal chemist who trained at Saint Joseph's College, Iowa State University and the University of Rochester, and, at the age of 32, discovered atorvastatin, the statin-class drug sold as Lipitor that would become the largest-selling drug in pharmaceutical history (as of 2003). His honours include being named a 2008 Hero of Chemistry by the American Chemical Society, and being chosen as the Perkin Medal awardee, the highest honour given in the U.S. chemical industry, by the Society of Chemical Industry, American section in 2013.

== Early life and education ==
Bruce D. Roth was born in June 1954 in Philadelphia, Pennsylvania. He began his academic career in 1972, attending Saint Joseph's College in Philadelphia, where he earned a Bachelor of Science degree in chemistry in 1976.

Roth received his undergraduate degree in chemistry from Saint Joseph's College, Philadelphia, in 1976. He then went to Iowa State University as a doctoral student under George Kraus, receiving his Ph.D. in organic chemistry in 1981. He then spent a year as a Postdoctoral Fellow with A.S. Kende at the University of Rochester.

== Career ==
Roth has held a number of positions in his career, from "Scientist" (medicinal chemist) through to vice president-level positions in drug discovery, and his accomplishments in his career include the discovery of the molecule atorvastatin, which would become the drug Lipitor.

=== Positions ===
In 1982, 28-year-old Roth began work as a medicinal chemist for the Parke Davis research area of Warner-Lambert, becoming the chemistry co-chair of the statins effort, with biologist Roger Newton, in 1984. By 1985, he was at Warner-Lambert's Parke-Davis Pharmaceutical Research facility in Ann Arbor, Michigan. He was promoted to Research Associate in 1986, Senior Research Associate in 1988, Section Director in 1990, Director of Atherosclerosis and Exploratory Chemistry in 1992, and Senior Director of Atherosclerosis, Inflammation and Exploratory Chemistry in 1993. By the early 1990s he held managerial positions and was no longer doing laboratory work. In 2000 Warner-Lambert acquired Parke-Davis. He was appointed Vice President of Chemistry just prior to the merger between Warner-Lambert and Pfizer in 2000 and remained in that role as a part of Pfizer Global Research and Development in Ann Arbor, Michigan until 2007. He then joined Genentech in San Francisco, California as Vice President of Discovery Chemistry.

=== Atorvastatin ===
Before atorvastatin, Roth worked to develop a different drug, but Sandoz AG beat his team to a patent. In 1985, while working at Warner-Lambert's Parke-Davis research facility, Roth "identified a molecule" that inhibited HMG CoA reductase, a "key enzyme in the metabolic pathway the body uses to produce cholesterol."

Roth was listed as the inventor of trans-6-[2-(3- or 4-carboxamido-substituted pyrrol-1-yl)alkyl]-4-hydroxypyran-2-one, patented in 1986, and developed into the on-market drug, atorvastatin, which ultimately would be sold as Lipitor, and which would become the largest-selling drug in pharmaceutical history by 2003. Pfizer acquired Warner-Lambert and Lipitor in 2000.

=== Other activities ===
From 1996 until 2007, Roth served as an adjunct professor in the Department of Medicinal Chemistry at the University of Michigan.

== Awards and honours ==
For the discovery of atorvastatin, Roth received the 1997 Warner-Lambert Chairman's Distinguished Scientific Achievement Award, the 1999 Inventor of the Year Award from the New York Intellectual Property Law Association, the 2003 American Chemical Society Award for Creative Invention, the 2003 Gustavus John Esselen Award for Chemistry in the Public Service, the 2005 Iowa State University Distinguished Alumni Award, and the 2006 Pfizer Global Research and Development Achievement Award. Roth was named a 2008 Hero of Chemistry by the American Chemical Society. In 2013, he was chosen as the Perkin Medal awardee, the highest honour given in the U.S. chemical industry, by the Society of Chemical Industry, American section, for his innovation in applied chemistry that resulted in the outstanding commercial success of atorvastatin.

== Representative publications ==
According to the Chemical Heritage Foundation, in "addition to his discovery of atorvastatin, Roth is the inventor or co-inventor of 42 patents and the author or co-author of 48 manuscripts, 35 published abstracts and eight book chapters."

His publications include:

- Baumann, K.L.; Butler, D.E.; Deering, C.F.; et al. (1992). "The convergent synthesis of CI-981, an optically active, highly potent, tissue selective inhibitor of HMG-CoA reductase". Tetrahedron Lett. 33 (17): 2283–2284. doi:10.1016/S0040-4039(00)74190-6.
- Brower PL, Butler DE, Deering CF, Le TV, Millar A, Nanninga TN, Roth BD (1992). "The synthesis of (4R-Cis)-1, 1-dimethylethyl, 6-cyanomethyl-2,2-dimethyl-1,3- dioxane-4-acetate, a key intermediate for the preparation of CI-981, a highly potent, tissue selective inhibitor of HMG-CoA reductase". Tetrahedron Lett. 33 (17): 2279–82. doi:10.1016/s0040-4039(00)74189-x.
- Roth BD; Blankley CJ; Chucholowski AW; Ferguson E; Hoefle ML; Ortwine DF; Newton RS; Sekerke CS; Sliskovic DR; Stratton CD; et al. (Jan 1991). "Inhibitors of cholesterol biosynthesis. 3. Tetrahydro-4-hydroxy-6-[2-(1H-pyrrol-1-yl)ethyl]-2H-pyran-2-one inhibitors of HMG-CoA reductase. 2. Effects of introducing substituents at positions three and four of the pyrrole nucleus". J Med Chem. 34 (1): 357–66. doi:10.1021/jm00105a056. PMID 1992137.
- Roth BD; Bocan TM; Blankley CJ; Chucholowski AW; Creger PL; Creswell MW; Ferguson E; Newton RS; O'Brien P; Picard JA; et al. (Jan 1991). "Relationship between tissue selectivity and lipophilicity for inhibitors of HMG-CoA reductase". J Med Chem. 34 (1): 463–6. doi:10.1021/jm00105a071. PMID 1992149.
- Shaw MK, Newton RS, Sliskovic DR, Roth BD, Ferguson E, Krause BR (Jul 1990). "Hep-G2 cells and primary rat hepatocytes differ in their response to inhibitors of HMG-CoA reductase". Biochem Biophys Res Commun. 170 (2): 726–34. doi:10.1016/0006-291x(90)92151-o. PMID 2166504.
- Roth BD, Ortwine DF, Hoefle ML, Stratton CD, Sliskovic DR, Wilson MW, Newton RS (Jan 1990). "Inhibitors of cholesterol biosynthesis. 1. trans-6-(2-pyrrol-1-ylethyl)-4-hydroxypyran-2-ones, a novel series of HMG-CoA reductase inhibitors. 1. Effects of structural modifications at the 2- and 5-positions of the pyrrole nucleus". J Med Chem. 33 (1): 21–31. doi:10.1021/jm00163a005. PMID 2296019.
- Sliskovic DR, Roth BD, Wilson MW, Hoefle ML, Newton RS (Jan 1990). "Inhibitors of cholesterol biosynthesis. 2. 1,3,5-trisubstituted [2-(tetrahydro-4-hydroxy-2-oxopyran-6-yl)ethyl]pyrazoles". J Med Chem. 33 (1): 31–8. doi:10.1021/jm00163a006. PMID 2296027.
- Roth BD, Bocan TMA, Blankley CJ, Chucholowski AW, Creger PL, Creswell MW, Ferguson E, Newton RS, O'Brien P, Picard JA, Roark WH, Sekerke CS, Sliskovic DR, Wilson MW. The Relationship Between Tissue Selectivity and Lipophilicity for Inhibitors of HMG-CoA Reductase. J. Med. Chem. 1991, 34, 463-6.
- Kende AS, Roth B, Sanfilippo PJ (1982). "Facile, palladium (II)- mediated synthesis of bridged and spirocyclic bicycloalkenones". J Am Chem Soc. 104 (6): 1784–5. Bibcode:1982JAChS.104.1784K. doi:10.1021/ja00370a076.
- Kende AS, Roth B, Sanfilippo PJ, Blacklock TJ (1982). "Mechanism and regioisomeric control in palladium (II) - mediated cycloalkenylations. A novel total synthesis of (+/-)-quadrone". J Am Chem Soc. 104 (21): 5808–10. Bibcode:1982JAChS.104.5808K. doi:10.1021/ja00385a053.
- Roth BD, Roark WH (1988). "Synthesis of a chiral synthon for the lactone portion of compactin and mevinolin". Tetrahedron Lett. 29 (11): 1255–8. doi:10.1016/s0040-4039(00)80269-5.
- Oxford, A.W.; Reitz, Allen B.; Dax, Scott L.; Roth, B.D. (2002). King, F.D. (ed.). "The Discovery and Development of Atorvastatin, a Potent Novel Hypolipidemic Agent". Progress in Medicinal Chemistry. 40: 1–22. doi:10.1016/S0079-6468(08)70080-8. ISBN 978-0-444-51054-9. PMID 12516521.
