= Streptomyces flavovirens =

Scientific classification
- Domain: Bacteria
- Kingdom: Bacillati
- Phylum: Actinomycetota
- Class: Actinomycetes
- Order: Streptomycetales
- Family: Streptomycetaceae
- Genus: Streptomyces
- Species: S. flavovirens

Binomial name
- Streptomyces flavovirens (Waksman 1923) Waksman and Henrici 1948 (Approved Lists 1980)

Type strain
- AS 4.575, ATCC 19758, ATCC 3320, BCRC 13689, BUCSAV 24, BUCSAV 6, CBS 129.20, CBS 189.75, CBS 279.30, CBS 496.68, CCM 3243, CCRC 13689, CGMCC 4.0575, DSM 40062, ETH 10248, ETH 24134, ETH 31593, HAMBI 1007, HUT-6019, HUT-6053, IAM 69, IAM W5-7, ICMP 479, IFO 12771, IFO 3197, IFO 3412, IFO 3716, IMET 40280, IMRU 3320, ISP 5062, JCM 4035, JCM 4578, KCC S-0035, LMG 20516, NBRC 12771, NBRC 3197, NBRC 3412, NBRC 3716, NRRL B-1329, NRRL B-2685, NRRL B-B-2685, NRRL-ISP 5062, PSA 217, RIA 1038, RIA 635, UNIQEM 144, VKM Ac-1723, VTT E-052937, VTT E-82159, WC 3320

Synonyms
- "Actinomyces flavogriseus" Duché 1934; "Actinomyces flavovirens" Waksman 1923; Streptomyces flavogriseus (Duché 1934) Waksman and Lechevalier 1953 (Approved Lists 1980); Streptomyces nigrifaciens Waksman 1961 (Approved Lists 1980)

Species of bacterium

Streptomyces flavovirens is a bacterium species from the genus of Streptomyces which has been isolated from soil. Streptomyces flavovirens produces the actinomycin complex and mureidomycin. A strain of this species has been used to produce pravastatin.

== See also ==
- List of Streptomyces species
