= Tahor =

The word Tahor may refer to:

- the trade name of Atorvastatin
- "ritually clean" in Hebrew, as in tumah and taharah
