= Niacin/lovastatin =

Drug combination

Combination of
- Nicotinic acid: Lipid-lowering agent
- Lovastatin: Statin

Clinical data
- Routes of administration: Oral
- ATC code: C10BA01 (WHO)

Legal status
- Legal status: US: ℞-only

Identifiers
- CAS Number: 365453-26-5
- KEGG: D10292

Niacin/lovastatin (trade names Advicor) was a drug combination used for the treatment of dyslipidemia. It was a combination of the lipid-modifying drug/vitamin niacin in extended release form and the statin drug lovastatin (trade name Mevacor). The combination preparation was developed by Kos Pharmaceuticals, Inc., which was acquired by Abbott Laboratories in 2006, subsequently transferred to AbbVie Inc. when that company was spun off from Abbott in January 2013.

Advicor was approved by the U.S. Food and Drug Administration (FDA) on December 17, 2001. The FDA withdrew approval on 18 April 2016. The reason given: "Based on the collective evidence from several large cardiovascular outcome trials (Refs. 1-3.), the Agency has concluded that the totality of the scientific evidence no longer supports the conclusion that a drug-induced reduction in triglyceride levels and/or increase in HDL-cholesterol levels in statin-treated patients results in a reduction in the risk of cardiovascular events." AbbVie Inc. agreed to voluntarily discontinue marketing Advicor. The same FDA action also applied to Simcor, a niacin-extended release combination with simvastatin.

== Dosage ==
The combination was available as tablets containing niacin/lovastatin:

- 500 mg/20 mg
- 750 mg/20 mg
- 1000 mg/20 mg
- 1000 mg/40 mg
