= Niacin/simvastatin =

Combination drug

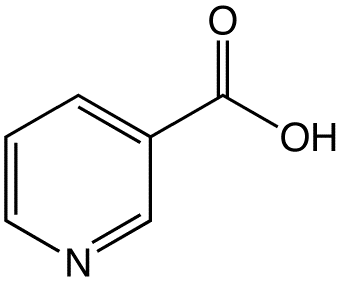

Combination of
- Nicotinic acid: Vitamin
- Simvastatin: Statin

Clinical data
- Routes of administration: Oral

Legal status
- Legal status: US: ℞-only

Identifiers
- CAS Number: 1054452-10-6

Niacin/simvastatin (trade name Simcor, by Abbott) is a combination drug consisting of an extended release form of the lipid-lowering drug niacin and the statin drug simvastatin. It is used for the treatment of dyslipidemia. It was approved by the FDA on February 15, 2008. On April 15, 2016, the FDA pulled the approval of niacin and fibrates used in combination with statin drugs, citing growing evidence that the benefits of combining niacin or fibrate drugs with statin drugs to not outweigh the risks, compared to statin therapy alone. This ruling applied to Advicor in addition to Simcor.
