= Amlodipine/atorvastatin =

Cholesterol and blood pressure medication

Combination of
- Amlodipine: Calcium channel blocker
- Atorvastatin: Statin

Clinical data
- Trade names: Caduet, Envacar, others
- AHFS/Drugs.com: Professional Drug Facts
- License data: US DailyMed: Caduet
- Pregnancy category: AU: D; Contraindicated
- Routes of administration: By mouth
- ATC code: C10BX03 (WHO)

Legal status
- Legal status: AU: S4 (Prescription only); US: ℞-only; In general: ℞ (Prescription only)

Identifiers
- CAS Number: 858659-02-6
- PubChem CID: 9811759
- ChemSpider: 7987512
- KEGG: D08488
- CompTox Dashboard (EPA): DTXSID101027010

Amlodipine/atorvastatin, sold under the brand name Caduet among others, is a fixed-dose combination medication for the treatment of high cholesterol and high blood pressure. It contains a statin and a calcium channel blocker.

== Society and culture ==
=== Brand names ===
Amlodipine/atorvastatin is marketed under the brand name Caduet in the United States, Australia, and Russia, and Envacar in the Philippines.

In some countries Caduet is marketed by Viatris after Upjohn was spun off from Pfizer.
