= HMG-CoA reductase =

Mammalian protein found in Homo sapiens

HMGCR
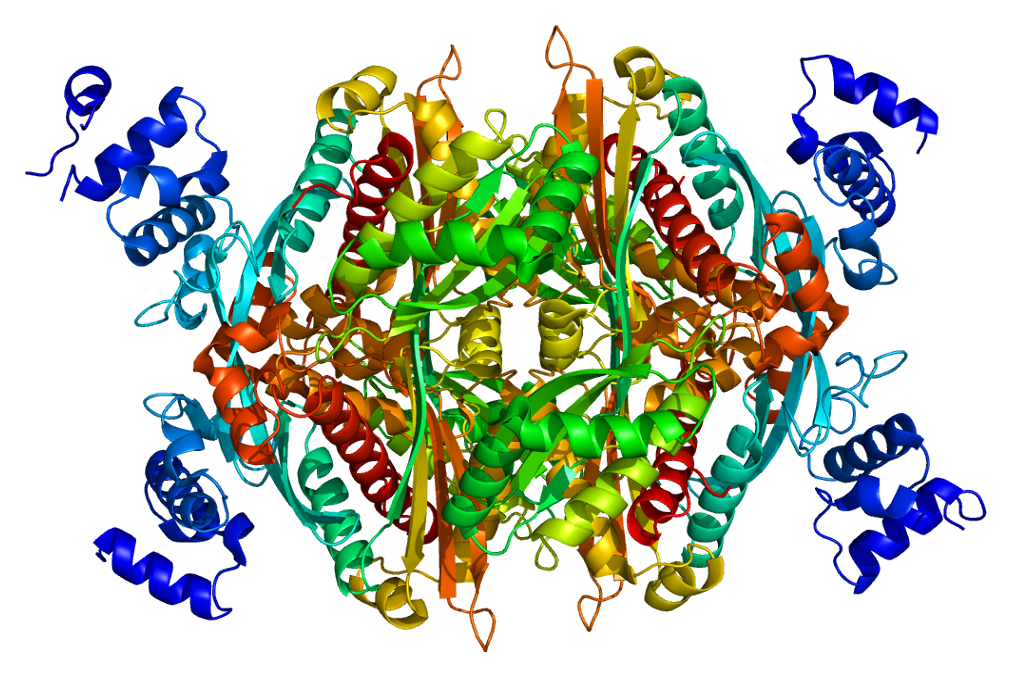

Identifiers
- Aliases: HMGCR, HMG-CoA reductase, Entrez 3156, LDLCQ3, 3-hydroxy-3-methylglutaryl-CoA reductase, Hydroxymethylglutaryl-CoA reductase
- External IDs: OMIM: 142910; MGI: 96159; GeneCards: HMGCR
Available structures
PDB	Ortholog search: PDBe RCSB
PDB	List of PDB id codes 1DQ8, 1DQ9, 1DQA, 1HW8, 1HW9, 1HWI, 1HWJ, 1HWK, 1HWL, 2Q1L, 2Q6B, 2Q6C, 2R4F, 3BGL, 3CCT, 3CCW, 3CCZ, 3CD0, 3CD5, 3CD7, 3CDA, 3CDB
Enzyme activity
EC #	BRENDA	ExPASy	KEGG	MetaCyc
1.1.1.34	↗	↗	↗	↗

Gene location (Human)
Chr.	Chromosome 5 (human)
Band	5q13.3	Start	75,336,329 bp
Band	5q13.3	End	75,364,001 bp

Gene location (Mouse)
Chr.	Chromosome 13 (mouse)
Band	13 D1|13 50.65 cM	Start	96,785,475 bp
Band	13 D1|13 50.65 cM	End	96,807,444 bp
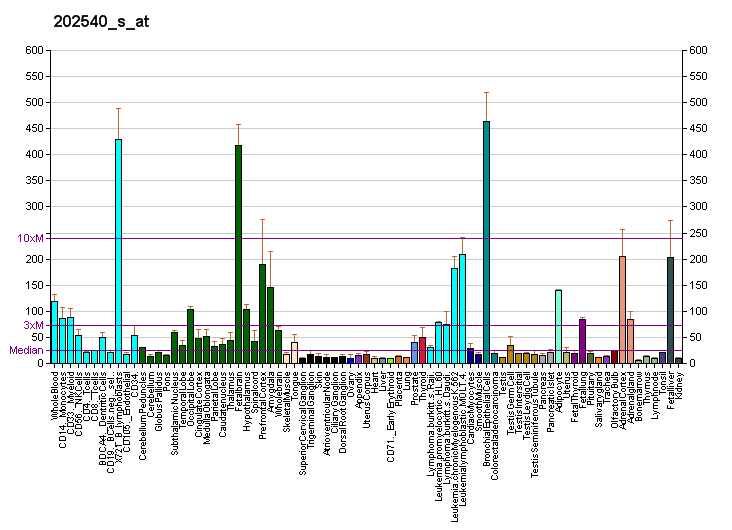

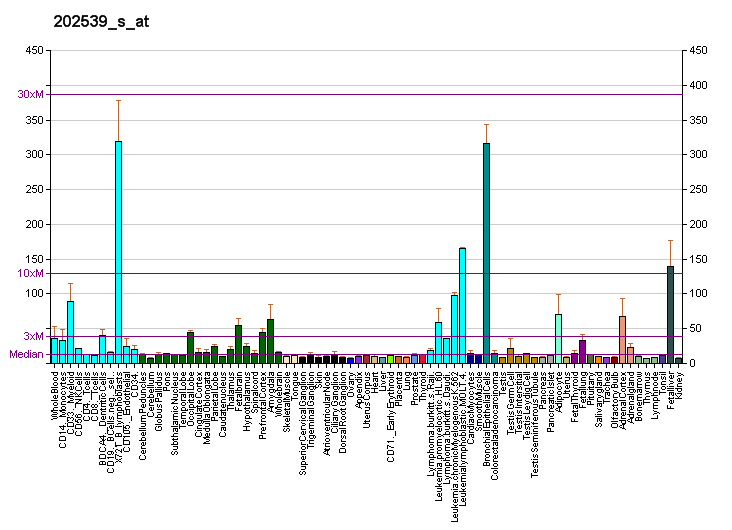
RNA expression pattern
Bgee	Human / Mouse (ortholog); Top expressed in: ventricular zone; ganglionic eminence; gingival epithelium; Brodmann area 23; skin of abdomen; human penis; middle temporal gyrus; skin of thigh; vulva; right adrenal cortex / Top expressed in: spermatocyte; ventricular zone; neural layer of retina; spermatid; lip; genital tubercle; right kidney; tail of embryo; superior cervical ganglion; hair follicle; More reference expression data
BioGPS	More reference expression data
Gene ontology
Molecular function	oxidoreductase activity, acting on the CH-OH group of donors, NAD or NADP as acceptor; protein homodimerization activity; hydroxymethylglutaryl-CoA reductase (NADPH) activity; protein binding; NADP binding; NADPH binding; oxidoreductase activity; protein phosphatase 2A binding
Cellular component	integral component of membrane; endoplasmic reticulum membrane; membrane; intracellular membrane-bounded organelle; peroxisomal membrane; endoplasmic reticulum
Biological process	visual learning; steroid metabolic process; sterol biosynthetic process; negative regulation of striated muscle cell apoptotic process; coenzyme A metabolic process; response to nutrient; positive regulation of skeletal muscle tissue development; lipid metabolism; positive regulation of cardiac muscle cell apoptotic process; negative regulation of insulin secretion involved in cellular response to glucose stimulus; ageing; negative regulation of apoptotic process; cholesterol metabolic process; protein tetramerization; isoprenoid biosynthetic process; negative regulation of MAP kinase activity; positive regulation of cell population proliferation; positive regulation of ERK1 and ERK2 cascade; negative regulation of wound healing; ubiquinone metabolic process; myoblast differentiation; response to ethanol; positive regulation of stress-activated MAPK cascade; positive regulation of smooth muscle cell proliferation; steroid biosynthetic process; regulation of lipid metabolic process; regulation of cholesterol biosynthetic process; cholesterol biosynthetic process; negative regulation of protein catabolic process; negative regulation of protein secretion; negative regulation of amyloid-beta clearance
Sources:Amigo / QuickGO
Orthologs
Databases	NCBI: entry; OMA: entry
Species	Human	Mouse
Entrez	3156	15357
Ensembl	ENSG00000113161	ENSMUSG00000021670
UniProt	P04035	Q01237
RefSeq (mRNA)	NM_000859; NM_001130996; NM_001364187	NM_008255; NM_001360165; NM_001360166
RefSeq (protein)	NP_000850; NP_001124468; NP_001351116; NP_000850.1	NP_032281; NP_001347094; NP_001347095
Location (UCSC)	Chr 5: 75.34 – 75.36 Mb	Chr 13: 96.79 – 96.81 Mb
PubMed search
- Wikidata
View/Edit Human	View/Edit Mouse

hydroxymethylglutaryl-CoA reductase (NADPH)
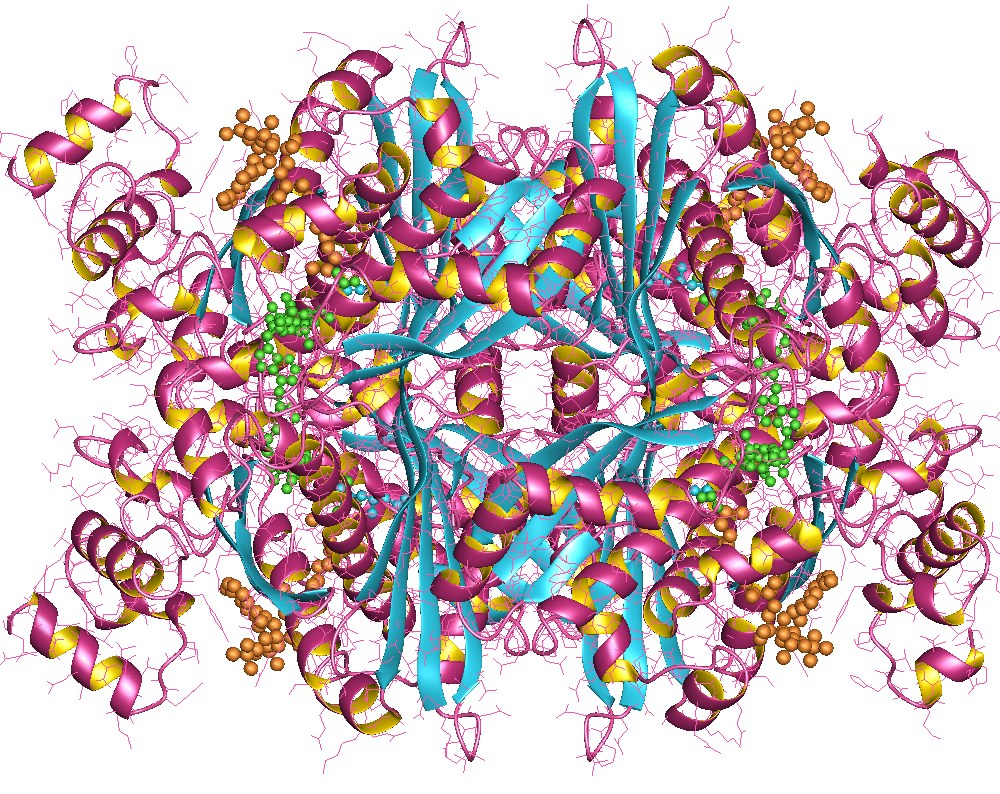
- HMG-CoA reductase (NADPH), Human

Identifiers
- EC no.: 1.1.1.34

Databases
- BRENDA: enzyme data
- ExPASy: NiceZyme view
- KEGG: enzyme entry
- MetaCyc: metabolic pathway
- Rhea: reactions
- PDB structures: RCSB PDB PDBe PDBsum
- Gene Ontology: AmiGO / QuickGO
Search
- PMC: articles
- PubMed: articles
- NCBI: proteins

HMG-CoA reductase, or 3-hydroxy-3-methylglutaryl-coenzyme A reductase, is enzyme that in humans is encoded by the gene HMGCR. It is the rate-limiting enzyme (EC 1.1.1.34) of the mevalonate pathway, which is the metabolic pathway that produces cholesterol and other isoprenoids.

HMGCR catalyzes the conversion of HMG-CoA to mevalonic acid, a necessary step in the biosynthesis of cholesterol. Normally in mammalian cells this enzyme is competitively suppressed so that its effect is controlled. Accordingly, HMGCR is the target of the widely available cholesterol-lowering drugs known collectively as statins, which help to treat dyslipidemia.

HMG-CoA reductase is anchored in the membrane of the endoplasmic reticulum, and was long regarded as having seven transmembrane domains, with the active site located in a long carboxyl terminal domain in the cytosol. More recent evidence shows it to contain eight transmembrane domains.

In humans, the gene for HMG-CoA reductase (NADPH) is located on the long arm of the fifth chromosome (5q13.3-14). Related enzymes having the same function are also present in other animals, plants and bacteria.

== Structure ==
The main isoform (isoform 1) of HMG-CoA reductase in humans is 888 amino acids long. It is a polytopic transmembrane protein (meaning it possesses many alpha helical transmembrane segments). It contains two main domains:

- a conserved N-terminal sterol-sensing domain (SSD, amino acid interval: 88–218). The related SSD of SCAP has been shown to bind cholesterol.
- a C-terminal catalytic domain (amino acid interval: 489-871), namely the 3-hydroxy-3-methyl-glutaryl-CoA reductase domain. This domain is required for the proper enzymatic activity of the protein.

Isoform 2 is 835 amino acids long. This variant is shorter because it lacks an exon in the middle region (amino acids 522–574). This does not affect any of the aforementioned domains.

== Function ==
HMGCR catalyses the conversion of HMG-CoA to mevalonic acid, a necessary step in the biosynthesis of cholesterol:

Mevalonate pathway

Normally in mammalian cells this enzyme is competitively suppressed by cholesterol derived from the internalization and degradation of low density lipoprotein (LDL) via the LDL receptor as well as oxidized species of cholesterol. Competitive inhibitors of the reductase induce the expression of LDL receptors in the liver, which in turn increases the catabolism of plasma LDL and lowers the plasma concentration of cholesterol, which is an important determinant of atherosclerosis. This enzyme is thus the target of the widely available cholesterol-lowering drugs known collectively as the statins (see Drugs section for more).

In Drosophila melanogaster, Hmgcr is the homolog of Human HMGCR, and plays crucial roles in regulating energy metabolism and food intake but also sleep homeostasis through the central mechanisms according to these studies.

=== Interactive pathway map ===
Click on genes, proteins and metabolites below to link to respective articles. (Note: The interactive pathway map can be edited at WikiPathways: "Statin_Pathway_WP430".)

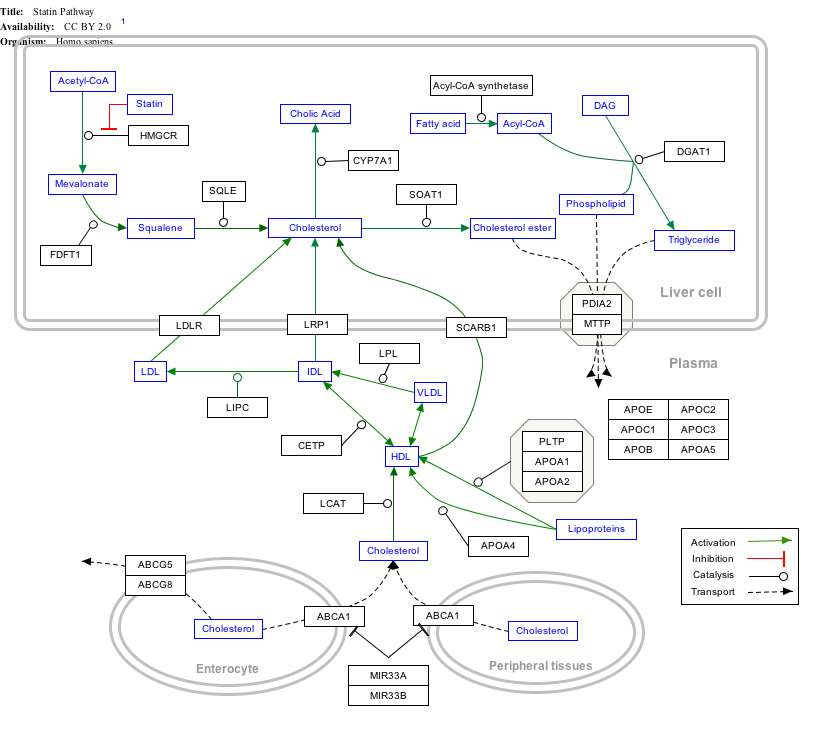

Statin pathway edit

== Inhibitors ==
=== Drugs ===
Drugs that inhibit HMG-CoA reductase, known collectively as HMG-CoA reductase inhibitors (or "statins"), are used to lower serum cholesterol as a means of reducing the risk for cardiovascular disease.

These drugs include rosuvastatin (CRESTOR), lovastatin (Mevacor), atorvastatin (Lipitor), pravastatin (Pravachol), fluvastatin (Lescol), pitavastatin (Livalo), and simvastatin (Zocor). Red yeast rice extract, one of the fungal sources from which the statins were discovered, contains several naturally occurring cholesterol-lowering molecules known as monacolins. The most active of these is monacolin K, or lovastatin (previously sold under the trade name Mevacor, and now available as generic lovastatin).

Vytorin is drug that combines the use simvastatin and ezetimibe, which slows the formation of cholesterol by every cell in the body, along with ezetimibe reducing absorption of cholesterol, typically by about 53%, from the intestines.

Statins, HMG-CoA reductase inhibitors, are competent in lowering cholesterol levels and reducing cardiac-related diseases. However, there have been controversies surrounding the potential of statins increasing the risk of new-onset diabetes mellitus (NOD). Experiments have demonstrated that glucose and cholesterol homeostasis are regulated by statins. The HMG-CoA reductase (HMGCR), converts HMG-CoA into mevalonic acid. Thus, when HMGCR activities are reduced, the cell associated cholesterols are also reduced. This results in the activation of SREBP-2-mediated signaling pathways. SREBP-2 activation for cholesterol homeostasis is crucial for the upregulation of low density lipoprotein (LDL) receptor (LDLR). The removal of LDL particles from blood circulation is enhanced when the number of LDLR on hepatocytes increases. Due to the removal of atherogenic lipoprotein particles, such as LDLs and intermediate density lipoproteins, HMGCR inhibitors have been proven to be efficient in reducing cardiovascular diseases from the blood circulation, which is represented by the reduction of LDL-cholesterol levels. In many studies, lipophilic statins are shown as more diabetogenic, possibly due to the fact that they can easily diffuse into cells and inhibit the production of isoprenoids which become more potent. Additionally, statins have been shown to change glucose levels as well.

=== Hormones ===
HMG-CoA reductase is active when blood glucose is high. The basic functions of insulin and glucagon are to maintain glucose homeostasis. Thus, in controlling blood sugar levels, they indirectly affect the activity of HMG-CoA reductase, but a decrease in activity of the enzyme is caused by AMP-activated protein kinase, which responds to an increase in AMP concentration, and also to leptin.

== Clinical significance ==
Since the reaction catalysed by HMG-CoA reductase is the rate-limiting step in cholesterol synthesis, this enzyme represents the sole major drug target for contemporary cholesterol-lowering drugs in humans. The medical significance of HMG-CoA reductase has continued to expand beyond its direct role in cholesterol synthesis following the discovery that statins can offer cardiovascular health benefits independent of cholesterol reduction. Statins have been shown to have anti-inflammatory properties, most likely as a result of their ability to limit production of key downstream isoprenoids that are required for portions of the inflammatory response. It can be noted that blocking of isoprenoid synthesis by statins has shown promise in treating a mouse model of multiple sclerosis, an inflammatory autoimmune disease.

Inhibition of HMG-CoA reductase by statins is lessened in patients with type 2 diabetes, which results in lessened inhibition of coronary atheromatous plaque, development.

HMG-CoA reductase is an important developmental enzyme. Inhibition of its activity and the concomitant lack of isoprenoids that yields can lead to germ cell migration defects as well as intracerebral hemorrhage.

Homozygous mutation of HMGCR can lead to a form of limb girdle myopathy that may share features with mild statin-induced myopathy. The clinical syndrome was partially reversed in a model system by supplementation with the downstream metabolite mevalonolactone.

The presence of anti HMG-CoA reductase antibodies is seen in people with statin-associated autoimmune myopathy, which is a very rare form of muscle damage caused by the immune system in people who take statin medications. The exact mechanism is unclear. A combination of consistent findings on physical examination, the presence of anti HMG-CoA reductase antibodies in a person with myopathy, evidence of muscle breakdown, and muscle biopsy diagnose SAAM.

== Regulation ==
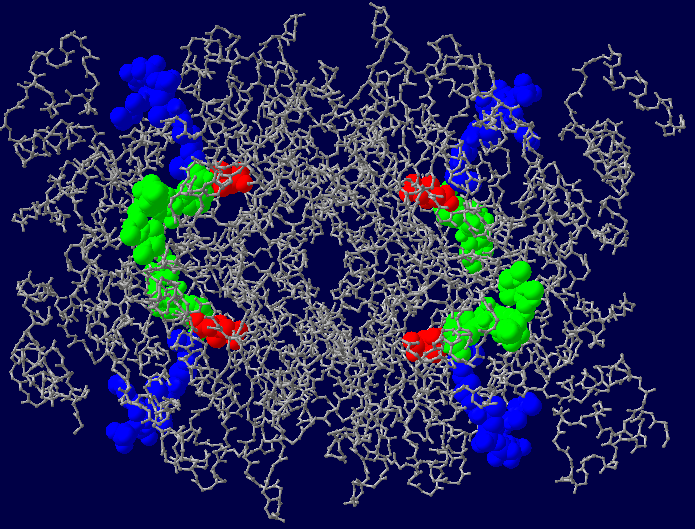
HMG-CoA reductase-Substrate complex (Blue:Coenzyme A, red:HMG, green:NADP)

Regulation of HMG-CoA reductase is achieved at several levels: transcription, translation, degradation and phosphorylation.

=== Transcription ===
Transcription of the reductase gene is enhanced by the sterol regulatory element-binding protein (SREBP). This protein binds to the sterol regulatory element (SRE), located on the 5' end of the reductase gene after controlled proteolytic processing. When SREBP is inactive, it is bound to the ER or nuclear membrane with another protein called SREBP cleavage-activating protein (SCAP). SCAP senses low cholesterol concentration and transports SREBP to the Golgi membrane where a consecutive proteolysis by S1P and S2P cleaves SREBP into an active nuclear form, nSREBP. nSREBPs migrate to the nucleus and activate transcription of SRE-containing genes. The nSREBP transcription factor is short-lived. When cholesterol levels rise, INSIG1 and INSIG2 retain the SCAP-SREBP complex in the ER membrane by preventing its incorporation into COPII vesicles.

=== Translation ===
Translation of mRNA is inhibited by a mevalonate derivative, which has been reported to be the isoprenoid farnesol, although this role has been disputed.

=== Degradation ===
Rising levels of sterols increase the susceptibility of the reductase enzyme to ER-associated degradation (ERAD) and proteolysis. Helices 2-6 (total of 8) of the HMG-CoA reductase transmembrane domain are thought to sense increased cholesterol levels (direct sterol binding to the SSD of HMG-CoA reductase has not been demonstrated). Lysine residues 89 and 248 can become ubiquinated by ER-resident E3 ligases. The identity of the multiple E3 ligases involved in HMG-CoA degradation is controversial, with suggested candidates being AMFR, Trc8, and RNF145 The involvement of AMFR and Trc8 has been contested.

=== Phosphorylation ===
Short-term regulation of HMG-CoA reductase is achieved by inhibition by phosphorylation (of Serine 872, in humans). Decades ago it was believed that a cascade of enzymes controls the activity of HMG-CoA reductase: an HMG-CoA reductase kinase was thought to inactivate the enzyme, and the kinase in turn was held to be activated via phosphorylation by HMG-CoA reductase kinase kinase. An excellent review on regulation of the mevalonate pathway by Nobel Laureates Joseph Goldstein and Michael Brown adds specifics: HMG-CoA reductase is phosphorylated and inactivated by an AMP-activated protein kinase, which also phosphorylates and inactivates acetyl-CoA carboxylase, the rate-limiting enzyme of fatty acid biosynthesis. Thus, both pathways utilizing acetyl-CoA for lipid synthesis are inactivated when energy charge is low in the cell, and concentrations of AMP rise. There has been a great deal of research on the identity of upstream kinases that phosphorylate and activate the AMP-activated protein kinase.

Fairly recently, LKB1 has been identified as a likely AMP kinase kinase, which appears to involve calcium/calmodulin signaling. This pathway likely transduces signals from leptin, adiponectin, and other signaling molecules.

== See also ==
- Oxidoreductase
