= Pitavastatin =

Chemical compound

Clinical data
- Trade names: Livalo, Livazo, others
- AHFS/Drugs.com: Monograph
- MedlinePlus: a610018
- License data: US DailyMed: Pitavastatin
- Pregnancy category: AU: D
- Routes of administration: By mouth
- ATC code: C10AA08 (WHO) C10BA13 (WHO)

Legal status
- Legal status: AU: S4 (Prescription only); CA: ℞-only; UK: POM (Prescription only); US: ℞-only; In general: ℞ (Prescription only)

Pharmacokinetic data
- Bioavailability: 60%
- Protein binding: 96%
- Metabolism: Liver (CYP2C9, minimally)
- Elimination half-life: 11 hours
- Excretion: Faeces

Identifiers
- IUPAC name: (3R,5S,6E)-7-[2-Cyclopropyl-4-(4-fluorophenyl)quinolin-3-yl]-3,5-dihydroxyhept-6-enoic acid
- CAS Number: 147511-69-1
- PubChem CID: 5282452
- IUPHAR/BPS: 3035
- ChemSpider: 4445604
- UNII: M5681Q5F9P
- ChEBI: CHEBI:32020
- ChEMBL: ChEMBL1201753
- CompTox Dashboard (EPA): DTXSID1048384
- ECHA InfoCard: 100.171.153

Chemical and physical data
- Formula: C_{25}H_{24}FNO_{4}
- Molar mass: 421.468 g·mol^{−1}
- 3D model (JSmol): Interactive image
- SMILES: O=C(O)C[C@H](O)C[C@H](O)/C=C/c1c(c3ccccc3nc1C2CC2)c4ccc(F)cc4
- InChI: InChI=1S/C25H24FNO4/c26-17-9-7-15(8-10-17)24-20-3-1-2-4-22(20)27-25(16-5-6-16)21(24)12-11-18(28)13-19(29)14-23(30)31/h1-4,7-12,16,18-19,28-29H,5-6,13-14H2,(H,30,31)/b12-11+/t18-,19-/m1/s1; Key:VGYFMXBACGZSIL-MCBHFWOFSA-N

Pitavastatin (usually as a calcium salt) is a member of the blood cholesterol lowering medication class of statins.

Pitavastatin is an inhibitor of HMG-CoA reductase, the enzyme that catalyses the first step of cholesterol synthesis.

It was patented in 1987 and approved for medical use in 2003. It is available in Japan, South Korea and in India. In the US, it received FDA approval in 2009. Kowa Pharmaceuticals, a subsidiary of Kowa Company, is the owner of the American patent to pitavastatin.

== Medical uses ==
Pitavastatin is indicated for hypercholesterolaemia (elevated cholesterol) and for the prevention of cardiovascular disease.

A 2009 study of the 104-week LIVES trial found pitavastatin increased HDL cholesterol, especially in patients with HDL lower than 40 mg/dL, who had a 24.6% rise, in addition to reducing LDL cholesterol 31.3%. HDL improved in patients who switched from other statins and rose over time. In the 70-month CIRCLE observational study, pitavastatin increased HDL more than atorvastatin.

It has neutral or possibly beneficial effects on glucose control. As a consequence, pitavastatin is likely to be appropriate for patients with metabolic syndrome plus high LDL, low HDL and diabetes mellitus.

== Side effects ==
Common statin-related side effects (headaches, stomach upset, abnormal liver function tests and muscle cramps) were similar to other statins. Pitavastatin is a lipophilic statin. Reports indicate that this statin may lead to fewer muscle side effects than other statins. One study found that coenzyme Q_{10} was not reduced as much as with certain other statins (though this is unlikely given the inherent chemistry of the HMG-CoA reductase pathway that all statin drugs inhibit).

There is evidence that pitavastatin does not increase insulin resistance in humans, with insulin resistance assessed by the homeostatic model assessment (HOMA-IR) method.

Hyperuricemia or increased levels of serum uric acid have been reported with pitavastatin.

== Metabolism and interactions ==
Statins are metabolised in part by one or more liver cytochrome P450 enzymes, leading to an increased potential for drug interactions and problems with certain foods (such as grapefruit juice). The primary metabolism pathway of pitavastatin is glucuronidation. It is minimally metabolized by the CYP450 enzymes CYP2C9 and CYP2C8, but not by CYP3A4 (which is a common source of interactions in other statins). As a result, it is less likely to interact with drugs that are metabolized via CYP3A4, which might be important for elderly patients who need to take multiple medicines.

== History ==
Pitavastatin (previously known as itavastatin, itabavastin, nisvastatin, NK-104, or NKS-104) was discovered in Japan by Nissan Chemical Industries and developed further by Kowa Pharmaceuticals, Tokyo. Pitavastatin was approved for use in the United States by the FDA in August 2009, under the brand name Livalo. Pitavastatin has been also approved by the Medicines and Healthcare products Regulatory Agency (MHRA) in UK in August 2010. Zypitamag (pitavastatin magnesium), a pharmaceutical alternative to Livalo, was approved for use in the United States by the FDA in 2017.

== Society and culture ==
=== Brand names ===
Pitavastatin is marketed in the United States under the brand names Livalo and Zypitamag, and in the European Union and Russia under the brand name Livazo.

== Research ==
Synthetic lethality has been demonstrated in mice with triple-negative breast cancer by combining pitavastatin with the AKT inhibitor AZD5363 (capivasertib).
