= Milton Silverman =

American pharmacologist

Milton Morris Silverman (1910–1997) was an American drug researcher, an investigator of the international pharmaceutical industry, and science editor of the San Francisco Chronicle.

Milton Silverman is the author of The Drugging of the Americas (Berkeley, 1976, University of California Press).He also co-authored Pills, Profits and Politics with Philip R. Lee.
