= Fluvastatin =

Chemical compound

Clinical data
- Trade names: Lescol, others
- AHFS/Drugs.com: Monograph
- MedlinePlus: a694010
- Pregnancy category: AU: D
- Routes of administration: By mouth (capsules, tablets)
- ATC code: C10AA04 (WHO)

Legal status
- Legal status: AU: S4 (Prescription only); CA: ℞-only; UK: POM (Prescription only); US: ℞-only; In general: ℞ (Prescription only)

Pharmacokinetic data
- Bioavailability: 24–30%
- Protein binding: >98%
- Metabolism: Hepatic: CYP2C9 (75%), CYP3A4 (20%), CYP2C8 (5%)
- Elimination half-life: 1–3 hours (capsule), 9 hours (XR formulations)
- Excretion: Faeces (95%), urine (5%)

Identifiers
- IUPAC name: (3R,5S,6E)-7-[3-(4-Fluorophenyl)-1-(propan-2-yl)-1H-indol-2-yl]-3,5-dihydroxyhept-6-enoic acid
- CAS Number: 93957-54-1
- PubChem CID: 446155
- IUPHAR/BPS: 2951
- DrugBank: DB01095
- ChemSpider: 393587
- UNII: 4L066368AS
- KEGG: D07983
- ChEBI: CHEBI:38565
- ChEMBL: ChEMBL1078
- CompTox Dashboard (EPA): DTXSID201020962 DTXSID2020636, DTXSID201020962
- ECHA InfoCard: 100.224.327

Chemical and physical data
- Formula: C_{24}H_{26}FNO_{4}
- Molar mass: 411.473 g·mol^{−1}
- 3D model (JSmol): Interactive image
- SMILES: O=C(O)C[C@H](O)C[C@H](O)/C=C/c2c(c1ccccc1n2C(C)C)c3ccc(F)cc3
- InChI: InChI=1S/C24H26FNO4/c1-15(2)26-21-6-4-3-5-20(21)24(16-7-9-17(25)10-8-16)22(26)12-11-18(27)13-19(28)14-23(29)30/h3-12,15,18-19,27-28H,13-14H2,1-2H3,(H,29,30)/b12-11+/t18-,19-/m1/s1; Key:FJLGEFLZQAZZCD-MCBHFWOFSA-N

Fluvastatin is a member of the statin drug class, used to treat hypercholesterolemia and to prevent cardiovascular disease.

It was patented in 1982 and approved for medical use in 1994. It is on the World Health Organization's List of Essential Medicines.

== Adverse effects ==
Adverse effects are comparable to other statins. Common are nausea, indigestion, insomnia and headache. Myalgia (muscle pain), and rarely rhabdomyolysis, characteristic side effects for statins, can also occur.

== Interactions ==
Contrary to lovastatin, simvastatin and atorvastatin, fluvastatin has no relevant interactions with drugs that inhibit the liver enzyme CYP3A4, and a generally lower potential for interactions than most other statins. Fluconazole, a potent inhibitor of CYP2C9, does increase fluvastatin levels.

== Pharmacology ==
=== Mechanism of action ===
Fluvastatin works by blocking the liver enzyme HMG-CoA reductase, which facilitates an important step in cholesterol synthesis.

=== Pharmacodynamics ===
In a Cochrane systematic review the dose-related magnitudes of fluvastatin on blood lipids was determined. Over the dose range of 10 to 80 mg/day total cholesterol was reduced by 10.7% to 24.9%, LDL cholesterol by 15.2% to 34.9%, and triglycerides by 3% to 17.5%.

=== Pharmacokinetics ===
The drug is quickly and almost completely (98%) absorbed from the gut. Food intake slows down absorption, but does not decrease it. Due to its first-pass effect, bioavailability is lower: about 24–30% according to different sources. Over 98% of the substance is bound to plasma proteins.

Several cytochrome P450 enzymes (mainly CYP2C9, but also CYP3A4 and CYP2C8) are involved in the metabolism of fluvastatin, which makes is less liable to interactions than most other statins. The main metabolite is inactive and is called "N-desisopropyl propionic acid" in the literature.

93–95% of the drug is excreted via the feces, less than 2% of which in form of the original substance.

== Names ==
Fluvastatin is the INN. Brandnames include Lescol, Canef, Vastin.

== Research ==
Data from the Cholesterol Treatment Trialists' (CTT) publication was used to determine the effects of fluvastatin, atorvastatin and rosuvastatin on LDL cholesterol lowering and reduction of myocardial infarction. In two RCTs an average dose of 72 mg/day fluvastatin reduced LDL cholesterol by 31.9%, and reduced myocardial infarction, relative risk, 0.68 (95% CI 0.55 to 0.85) as compared to placebo. In five RCTs a mean atorvastatin dose of 26 mg/day reduced LDL cholesterol by 44.0% and reduced myocardial infarction, relative risk, 0.67 (95% CI 0.58 to 0.77) as compared to placebo. In four RCTs a mean rosuvastatin dose of 16 mg/day reduced LDL cholesterol by 48.8% and reduced myocardial infarction, relative risk, 0.82 (95% CI 0.73 to 0.93) as compared to placebo. Thus despite reducing LDL cholesterol by a much lesser amount with fluvastatin than atorvastatin and rosuvastatin, fluvastatin reduced myocardial infarction similarly to atorvastatin and to a greater degree than rosuvastatin.
