= Statin =

Class of drugs to lower cholesterol

- Drug class
- Lovastatin, a compound isolated from Aspergillus terreus, was the first statin to be marketed.

Class identifiers
- Synonyms: HMG-CoA reductase inhibitors
- Use: High cholesterol
- ATC code: C10AA
- Biological target: HMG-CoA reductase

Clinical data
- Drugs.com: Drug Classes

External links
- MeSH: D019161

Legal status

Statins (or HMG-CoA reductase inhibitors) are a class of medications that lower the concentration of cholesterol in the blood. They are typically prescribed to people who are at high risk of cardiovascular disease.

Low-density lipoprotein (LDL) carriers of cholesterol play a key role in the development of atherosclerosis and coronary heart disease via the mechanisms described by the lipid hypothesis. As lipid-lowering medications, statins are effective in lowering apolipoprotein B and LDL cholesterol; they are widely used for primary prevention in people at high risk of cardiovascular disease, as well as in secondary prevention for those who have cardiovascular disease. Statins reduce the risk of myocardial infarction and stroke.

Side effects of statins include an increased risk of muscle pain, a slightly increased risk of diabetes, and abnormal blood levels of certain liver enzymes in some people. Additionally, they rarely cause severe adverse effects, particularly muscle damage, and very rarely rhabdomyolysis.

They act by inhibiting the enzyme HMG-CoA reductase, which plays a central role in cholesterol production. High cholesterol levels in the blood have been associated with cardiovascular disease.

There are various statins, some of which include atorvastatin, fluvastatin, lovastatin, pitavastatin, pravastatin, rosuvastatin, and simvastatin. Combination preparations of a statin and another agent, such as ezetimibe/simvastatin, are also available. The class is on the World Health Organization's List of Essential Medicines with simvastatin being the listed medicine.

In 2024, US sales were estimated at $5–6B, down from $19B in 2005. The best-selling statin is atorvastatin, also known as Lipitor, which in 2003 became the best-selling pharmaceutical in history at $12B in 2008.

Patient compliance with statin usage is problematic despite robust evidence of their benefits.

== Medical uses ==
Statins are usually used to lower blood cholesterol levels and reduce the risk of illnesses related to atherosclerosis, with varying degrees of effect depending on underlying risk factors and history of cardiovascular disease. A 2022 systematic review found the absolute risk reductions for three hard outcomes – all-cause mortality, myocardial infarction, and stroke – to be 0.8%, 1.3%, and 0.4%, respectively (relative risk: 9%, 29%, 14%). The association between effect size and LDL cholesterol reduction was unclear, and there was significant clinical and statistical heterogeneity between trials. Clinical practice guidelines generally recommend that people at low risk start with lifestyle modification through a cholesterol-lowering diet and physical exercise; for those unable to meet their lipid-lowering goals through such methods, statins can be helpful. The medication appears to work equally well regardless of sex, although some sex-related differences in treatment response were described. Lowering LDL-C early in life for those with family histories of atherosclerotic cardiovascular disease may yield much greater lifetime benefits, as the atherosclerotic process of fatty/foamy plaque deposition starts early in life and progressively worsens over a lifetime in those at risk. The smaller absolute effects on risk reduction by statins may thus be attributable to starting statins too late and thus yielding plaque stabilization when the plaques have already progressed to a severe state, and this is supported in part by mendelian randomization trials.

If there is an underlying history of cardiovascular disease, it has a significant impact on the effects of statin. This can be used to divide medication usage into broad categories of primary and secondary prevention.

=== Primary prevention ===
For the primary prevention of cardiovascular disease, the United States Preventive Services Task Force (USPSTF) 2016 guidelines recommend statins for those who have at least one risk factor for coronary heart disease, are between 40 and 75 years old, and have at least a 10% 10-year risk of heart disease, as calculated by the 2013 ACC/AHA Pooled Cohort algorithm. Risk factors for coronary heart disease included abnormal lipid levels in the blood, diabetes mellitus, high blood pressure, and smoking. They recommended selective use of low-to-moderate doses statins in the same adults who have a calculated 10-year cardiovascular disease event risk of 7.5–10% or greater. In people over the age of 70, statins decrease the risk of cardiovascular disease but only in those with a history of heavy cholesterol blockage in their arteries.

Most evidence suggests that statins are also effective in preventing heart disease in those with high cholesterol but no history of heart disease. A 2013 Cochrane review found a reduction in the risk of death and other poor outcomes without any evidence of harm. For every 138 people treated for 5 years, one fewer dies; for every 49 treated, one fewer has an episode of heart disease. A 2011 review reached similar conclusions, and a 2012 review found benefits in both women and men. A 2010 review concluded that treatment without a history of cardiovascular disease reduces cardiovascular events in men but not women, and provides no mortality benefit in either sex. Two other meta-analyses published that year, one of which used data obtained exclusively from women, found no mortality benefit in primary prevention.

The National Institute for Health and Clinical Excellence (NICE) recommends statin treatment for adults with an estimated 10-year risk of cardiovascular disease exceeding 10%. Guidelines by the American College of Cardiology and the American Heart Association recommend statin treatment for primary prevention of cardiovascular disease in adults with LDL cholesterol ≥ 190 mg/dL (4.9 mmol/L) or those who are age 40–75 with LDL-C 70–190 mg/dL (1.8–4.9 mmol/dL) and who have either diabetes or stage 3 or greater chronic kidney disease; or in those with a 10-year risk of developing heart attack or stroke of 7.5% or more. In this latter group, statin assignment was not automatic. In such cases, it was recommended to occur only after a clinician-patient risk discussion with shared decision-making, where other risk factors and lifestyle are addressed, the potential benefits of statin treatment are weighed against the potential for adverse effects or drug interactions, and informed patient preference is elicited. Moreover, if a risk decision was uncertain, factors such as family history, coronary calcium score, ankle-brachial index, and an inflammation test (hs-CRP ≥ 2.0 mg/L) were suggested to inform the risk decision. Additional factors that could be used were an LDL-C ≥ 160 mg/dL (4.14 mmol/L) or a very high lifetime risk. However, critics such as Steven E. Nissen say that the AHA/ACC guidelines were not properly validated, overestimate the risk by at least 50%, and recommend statins for people who will not benefit, based on populations whose observed risk is lower than predicted by the guidelines. The European Society of Cardiology and the European Atherosclerosis Society recommend the use of statins for primary prevention, depending on baseline estimated cardiovascular score and LDL thresholds. In 2026, the American College of Cardiology and the American Heart Association jointly released new guidelines recommending that the 2013 ACC/AHA Pooled Cohort algorithm be replaced with the PREVENT score.

=== Secondary prevention ===
In secondary prevention, statins are effective in decreasing mortality in people with pre-existing cardiovascular disease. Pre-existing disease can have many manifestations. Defining illnesses include a prior heart attack, stroke, stable or unstable angina, aortic aneurysm, or other arterial ischemic disease, in the presence of atherosclerosis. They are also advocated for primary prevention in people at high risk of developing coronary heart disease. On average, statins can lower LDL cholesterol by 1.8 mmol/L (70 mg/dL), which translates into an estimated 60% decrease in the number of cardiac events (heart attack, sudden cardiac death) and a 17% reduced risk of stroke after long-term treatment. A greater benefit is observed with high-intensity statin therapy. They have less effect than the fibrates or niacin in reducing triglycerides and raising HDL-cholesterol ("good cholesterol").

No studies have examined the effect of statins on cognition in patients with prior stroke. However, two large studies (HPS and PROSPER) that included people with vascular diseases reported that simvastatin and pravastatin did not impact cognition.

Statins have been studied for improving operative outcomes in cardiac and vascular surgery. Mortality and adverse cardiovascular events were reduced in statin groups. Current guidelines recommend that statins be given to all patients undergoing vascular surgery, when possible; however, for patients undergoing surgeries that are not vascular, the recommendation is to give statins only if the patient meets criteria according to the standard guidelines that apply to the general population.

Older adults who receive statin therapy at the time of discharge from the hospital after an inpatient stay have been studied. People with cardiac ischemia not previously on statins at the time of admission have a lower risk of major cardiac adverse events and hospital readmission two years post-hospitalization.

=== Comparative effectiveness ===
All statins appear effective regardless of potency or degree of cholesterol reduction. Simvastatin and pravastatin appear to have a reduced incidence of side-effects.

=== Women and children ===
According to the 2015 Cochrane systematic review, atorvastatin showed a greater cholesterol-lowering effect in women than in men compared to rosuvastatin.

In children, statins are effective at reducing cholesterol levels in those with familial hypercholesterolemia. Their long-term safety is, however, unclear. Some recommend that if lifestyle changes are not enough, statins should be started at 8 years old.

=== Familial hypercholesterolemia ===
Statins may be less effective in reducing LDL cholesterol in people with familial hypercholesterolemia, especially those with homozygous deficiencies. These people have defects usually in either the LDL receptor or apolipoprotein B genes, both of which are responsible for LDL clearance from the blood. Statins remain a first-line treatment in familial hypercholesterolemia, although other cholesterol-reducing measures may be required. In people with homozygous deficiencies, statins may still prove helpful, albeit at high doses and in combination with other cholesterol-reducing medications.

=== Contrast-induced nephropathy ===
A 2014 meta-analysis found that statins could reduce the risk of contrast-induced nephropathy by 53% in people undergoing coronary angiography/percutaneous interventions. The effect was found to be stronger among those with preexisting kidney dysfunction or diabetes mellitus.

=== Chronic kidney disease ===
The risk of cardiovascular disease is similar in people with chronic kidney disease and coronary artery disease, and statins are often suggested. There is some evidence that appropriate use of statin medications in people with chronic kidney disease who do not require dialysis may reduce mortality and the incidence of major cardiac events by up to 20% and are not likely to increase the risk of stroke or kidney failure. The 2026 guidelines published by the American Heart Association and American College of Cardiology recommend that most adults age 40-75 with chronic kidney disease stage 3 and higher take a statin medication.

=== Asthma ===
Statins have been identified as having a possible adjunct role in the treatment of asthma through anti-inflammatory pathways. There is low-quality evidence for the use of statins in treating asthma; further research is required to determine the effectiveness and safety of this therapy in those with asthma.

== Adverse effects ==
Choosing a statin for people with special considerations
Condition	Commonly recommended statins	Explanation
Kidney transplantation recipients taking ciclosporin	Pravastatin or fluvastatin	Drug interactions are possible, but studies have not shown that these statins increase exposure to ciclosporin.
HIV-positive people taking protease inhibitors	Atorvastatin, pravastatin or fluvastatin	Negative interactions are more likely with other choices.
Persons taking gemfibrozil, a non-statin lipid-lowering drug	Atorvastatin	Combining gemfibrozil and a statin increases risk of rhabdomyolysis and subsequently kidney failure
Persons taking the anticoagulant warfarin	Any statin	The statin use may require that the warfarin dose be changed, as some statins increase the effect of warfarin.

The most important adverse side effects are muscle problems, an increased risk of diabetes mellitus, and increased liver enzymes in the blood due to liver damage. Over 5 years of treatment, statins result in 50-100 cases of diabetes, 5-10 cases of hemorrhagic stroke, and 5 cases of muscle damage per 10,000 people treated. This could be due to the statins inhibiting the enzyme (HMG-CoA reductase), which is necessary to make cholesterol, but also for other processes, such as CoQ_{10} production, which is important for muscle function and sugar regulation.

Other possible adverse effects include neuropathy, pancreatic and liver dysfunction, and sexual dysfunction. The rate at which such events occur has been widely debated, in part because the risk/benefit ratio of statins in low-risk populations is highly dependent on the rate of adverse events. A Cochrane meta-analysis of statin clinical trials in primary prevention found no evidence of excess adverse events among those treated with statins compared to placebo. Another meta-analysis found a 39% increase in adverse events in statin-treated people relative to those receiving a placebo, but no increase in serious adverse events. The author of one study argued that adverse events are more common in clinical practice than in randomized clinical trials. A systematic review concluded that while clinical trial meta-analyses underestimate the rate of muscle pain associated with statin use, the rates of rhabdomyolysis are still "reassuringly low" and similar to those seen in clinical trials (about 1–2 per 10,000 person years). Another systematic review from the International Centre for Circulatory Health of the National Heart and Lung Institute in London concluded that only a small fraction of side effects reported by people on statins are actually attributable to the statin.

=== Cognitive effects ===
Multiple systematic reviews and meta-analyses have concluded that the available evidence does not support an association between statin use and cognitive decline. A 2010 meta-review of medical trials involving over 65,000 people concluded that statins decreased the risk of dementia, Alzheimer's disease, and even improved cognitive impairment in some cases. A 2025 review of 55 studies that included over 7 million patients found that: a) the statins significantly reduced the risk of developing dementia; b) their effects were greater in patients taking the statins for longer time periods (i.e., 3 years versus less than 1 year); c) the statins proved effective in reducing the development of all dementia forms including Alzheimer's disease (in individuals with or without type 2 diabetes), and vascular dementia; and d) the statins were more effective in individuals from Asia or the Americas. The statins tested for these effects were rosuvastatin (which had the strongest effects), atorvastatin, fluvastatin, lovastatin, pitavastatin, pravastatin, and Simvastatin.

Additionally, both the Patient-Centered Research into Outcomes Stroke Patients Prefer and Effectiveness Research (PROSPER) study and the Health Protection Study (HPS) demonstrated that simvastatin and pravastatin did not affect cognition for patients with risk factors for, or a history of, vascular diseases.

However, there are reports of reversible cognitive impairment in individuals treated with the statins. The U.S. Food and Drug Administration (FDA) package insert on statins includes a warning about the potential for non-serious and reversible cognitive side effects with the medication (memory loss, confusion).

=== Muscles ===
In observational studies, 10–15% of people who take statins experience muscle problems; in most cases, these consist of muscle pain. These rates, which are much higher than those seen in randomized clinical trials have been the topic of extensive debate and discussion.

Muscle pain and other symptoms often cause patients to stop taking a statin. This is known as statin intolerance. A 2021 double-blind multiple crossover randomized controlled trial (RCT) in statin-intolerant patients found that adverse effects, including muscle pain, were similar between atorvastatin and placebo. A smaller double-blind RCT obtained similar results. The results of these studies help explain why statin symptom rates in observational studies are so much higher than in double-blind RCTs and support the notion that the difference results from the nocebo effect; that the symptoms are caused by expectations of harm.

Media reporting on statins is often negative, and patient leaflets inform patients that rare but potentially serious muscle problems can occur during statin treatment. These create expectations of harm. Nocebo symptoms are real and bothersome and are a major barrier to treatment. Because of this, many people stop taking statins, which have been proven in numerous large-scale RCTs to reduce heart attacks, stroke, and deaths – as long as people continue to take them.

Serious muscle problems such as rhabdomyolysis (destruction of muscle cells) and statin-associated autoimmune myopathy occur in less than 0.1% of treated people. Rhabdomyolysis can in turn result in life-threatening kidney injury. The risk of statin-induced rhabdomyolysis increases with older age, use of interacting medications such as fibrates, and hypothyroidism. Coenzyme Q_{10} (ubiquinone) levels are decreased in statin use; CoQ_{10} supplements are sometimes used to treat statin-associated myopathy, though evidence of their efficacy is lacking as of 2017. The gene SLCO1B1 (Solute carrier organic anion transporter family member 1B1) codes for an organic anion-transporting polypeptide that is involved in the regulation of the absorption of statins. A common variation in this gene was found in 2008 to increase the risk of myopathy significantly.

Records exist of over 250,000 people treated from 1998 to 2001 with the statin medications atorvastatin, cerivastatin, fluvastatin, lovastatin, pravastatin, and simvastatin. The incidence of rhabdomyolysis was 0.44 per 10,000 patients treated with statins other than cerivastatin. However, the risk was over 10-fold greater if cerivastatin was used, or if the standard statins (atorvastatin, fluvastatin, lovastatin, pravastatin, or simvastatin) were combined with a fibrate (fenofibrate or gemfibrozil) treatment. Cerivastatin was withdrawn by its manufacturer in 2001.

Some researchers have suggested that hydrophilic statins, such as rosuvastatin and pravastatin, are less toxic than lipophilic statins, such as atorvastatin, lovastatin, and simvastatin. However, other studies have not found a connection. Lovastatin induces the expression of gene atrogin-1, which is believed to be responsible for promoting muscle fiber damage. Tendon rupture does not appear to occur.

=== Diabetes ===
The relationship between statin use and risk of developing diabetes remains unclear and the results of reviews are mixed. Higher doses have a greater effect, but the decrease in cardiovascular disease outweighs the risk of developing diabetes. Use in postmenopausal women is associated with an increased risk for diabetes. The exact mechanism responsible for the possible increased risk of diabetes mellitus associated with statin use is unclear. However, recent findings have indicated the inhibition of HMGCoAR as a key mechanism. Statins are thought to decrease cells' uptake of glucose from the bloodstream in response to the hormone insulin. One way this is thought to occur is by interfering with cholesterol synthesis which is necessary for the production of certain proteins responsible for glucose uptake into cells such as GLUT1.

=== Drug interactions ===
Combining any statin with a fibrate or niacin (other categories of lipid-lowering drugs) increases the risks for rhabdomyolysis 5.5-fold, to 13 per 10,000 persons, per year. Monitoring liver enzymes and creatine kinase is especially prudent in those on high-dose statins or in those on statin/fibrate combinations, and mandatory in the case of muscle cramps or of deterioration in kidney function.

Consumption of grapefruit or grapefruit juice inhibits the metabolism of certain statins, and bitter oranges may have a similar effect. Furanocoumarins in grapefruit juice (i.e. bergamottin and dihydroxybergamottin) inhibit the cytochrome P450 enzyme CYP3A4, which is involved in the metabolism of most statins (however, it is a major inhibitor of only lovastatin, simvastatin, and to a lesser degree, atorvastatin) and some other medications (flavonoids (i.e. naringin) were thought to be responsible). This increases the levels of the statin, increasing the risk of dose-related adverse effects (including myopathy/rhabdomyolysis). The absolute prohibition of grapefruit juice consumption for users of some statins is controversial.

The U.S. Food and Drug Administration (FDA) notified healthcare professionals of updates to the prescribing information concerning interactions between protease inhibitors and certain statin drugs. Protease inhibitors and statins taken together may increase the blood levels of statins and increase the risk of muscle injury (myopathy). The most serious form of myopathy, rhabdomyolysis, can damage the kidneys and lead to kidney failure, which can be fatal.

=== Other effects ===
Several meta-analyses have found no increased risk of cancer, and some meta-analyses have found a reduced risk. Specifically, statins may reduce the risk of esophageal cancer, colorectal cancer, gastric cancer, hepatocellular carcinoma, and possibly prostate cancer. They appear to have no effect on the risk of lung cancer, kidney cancer, breast cancer, pancreatic cancer, or bladder cancer.

Studies have found that the use of statins may protect against getting osteoporosis and bone fractures or may induce osteoporosis and fractures. A cross-sectional retrospective analysis of the Austrian population found that the risk of getting osteoporosis is dependent on the dose used.

== Mechanism of action ==
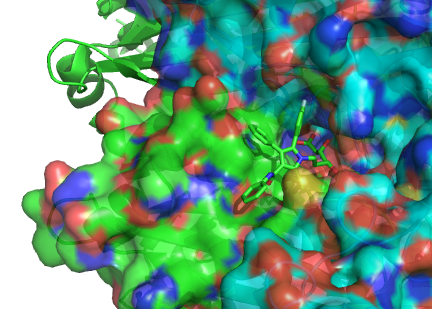
Atorvastatin bound to HMG-CoA reductase: PDB entry 1hwk

The HMG-CoA reductase pathway, which is blocked by statins via inhibiting the rate limiting enzyme HMG-CoA reductase.

Statins act by competitively inhibiting HMG-CoA reductase, the rate-limiting enzyme of the mevalonate pathway. Because statins are similar in structure to HMG-CoA on a molecular level, they will fit into the enzyme's active site and compete with the native substrate (HMG-CoA). This competition reduces the rate at which HMG-CoA reductase can produce mevalonate, the next molecule in the cascade that eventually produces cholesterol. A variety of natural statins are produced by Penicillium and Aspergillus fungi as secondary metabolites. These natural statins probably function to inhibit HMG-CoA reductase enzymes in bacteria and fungi that compete with the producer.

=== Inhibiting cholesterol synthesis ===
By inhibiting HMG-CoA reductase, statins block the pathway for synthesizing cholesterol in the liver. This is significant because most circulating cholesterol comes from internal manufacture rather than the diet. When the liver can no longer produce cholesterol, blood cholesterol levels will fall. Cholesterol synthesis appears to occur mostly at night, so statins with short half-lives are usually taken at night to maximize their effect. Studies have shown greater LDL and total cholesterol reductions in the short-acting simvastatin taken at night rather than in the morning, but have shown no difference in the long-acting atorvastatin.

=== Increasing LDL uptake ===
In rabbits, liver cells sense the reduced levels of liver cholesterol and seek to compensate by synthesizing LDL receptors to draw cholesterol out of the circulation. This is accomplished via proteases that cleave membrane-bound sterol regulatory element binding proteins, which then migrate to the nucleus and bind to the sterol response elements. The sterol response elements then facilitate increased transcription of various other proteins, most notably, LDL receptor. The LDL receptor is transported to the liver cell membrane and binds to passing LDL and VLDL particles, mediating their uptake into the liver, where the cholesterol is reprocessed into bile salts and other byproducts. This results in fewer LDL particles circulating in the blood.

=== Decreasing of specific protein prenylation ===
Statins, by inhibiting the HMG-CoA reductase pathway, inhibit downstream synthesis of isoprenoids, such as farnesyl pyrophosphate and geranylgeranyl pyrophosphate. Inhibition of protein prenylation for proteins such as RhoA (and subsequent inhibition of Rho-associated protein kinase) may be involved, at least partially, in the improvement of endothelial function, modulation of immune function, and other pleiotropic cardiovascular benefits of statins, as well as in the fact that a number of other drugs that lower LDL have not shown the same cardiovascular risk benefits in studies as statins, and may also account for some of the benefits seen in cancer reduction with statins. In addition, the inhibitory effect on protein prenylation may also be involved in a number of unwanted side effects associated with statins, including muscle pain (myopathy) and elevated blood sugar (diabetes).

=== Other effects ===
As noted above, statins exhibit action beyond lipid-lowering activity in the prevention of atherosclerosis through so-called "pleiotropic effects of statins". The pleiotropic effects of statins remain controversial. The ASTEROID trial showed direct ultrasound evidence of atheroma regression during statin therapy. Researchers hypothesize that statins prevent cardiovascular disease via four proposed mechanisms (all subjects of a large body of biomedical research):

1. Improve endothelial function
2. Modulate inflammatory responses
3. Maintain plaque stability
4. Prevent blood clot formation

In 2008, the JUPITER trial showed statins provided benefit in those who had no history of high cholesterol or heart disease, but only in those with elevated high-sensitivity C-reactive protein (hsCRP) levels, an indicator for inflammation. The study has been criticized due to perceived flaws in the study design, although Paul M. Ridker, lead investigator of the JUPITER trial, has responded to these criticisms at length.

Click on genes, proteins and metabolites below to link to respective articles. (Note: The interactive pathway map can be edited at WikiPathways: "Statin_Pathway_WP430".)

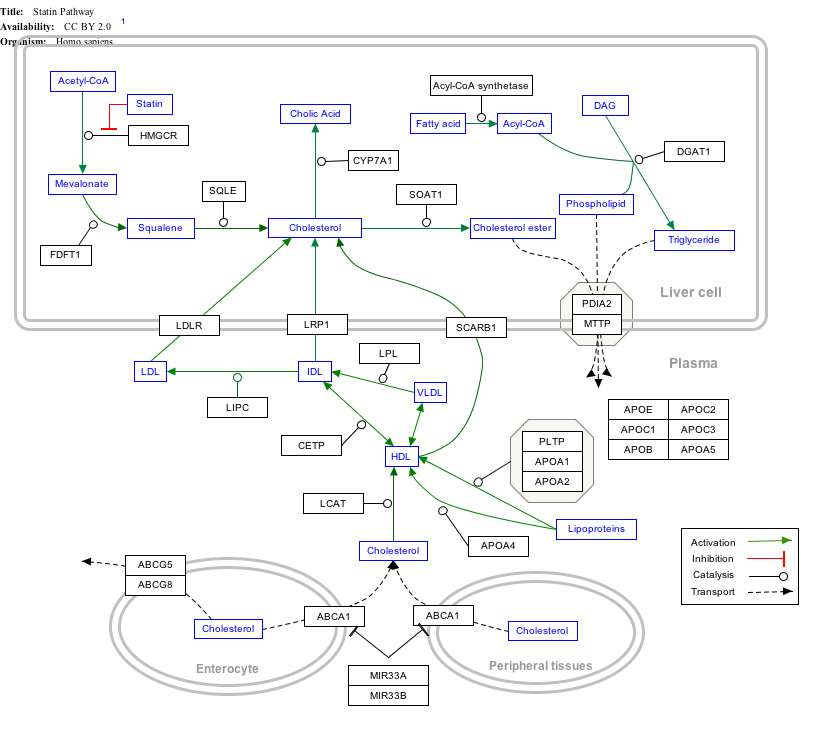

Statin pathway edit

As the target of statins, the HMG-CoA reductase, is highly similar between eukaryota and archaea, statins also act as antibiotics against archaea by inhibiting archaeal mevalonate biosynthesis. This has been shown in vivo and in vitro. Since patients with a constipation phenotype present with higher abundance of methanogenic archaea in the gut, the use of statins for management of irritable bowel syndrome has been proposed and may actually be one of the hidden benefits of statin use.

== Statin medications ==
The statins are divided into two groups: fermentation-derived and synthetic. Some specific medications are listed in the table below. Note that the associated brand names may vary between countries.

Statin	Image	Brand name	Derivation	Metabolism	Half-life
Atorvastatin		Arkas, Ator, Atoris, Lipitor, Torvast, Totalip	Synthetic	CYP3A4	14–19 hours.
Cerivastatin		Baycol, Lipobay (withdrawn from the market in August 2001 due to risk of serious rhabdomyolysis)	Synthetic	various CYP3A isoforms	
Fluvastatin		Lescol, Lescol XL, Lipaxan, Primesin	Synthetic	CYP2C9	1–3 hours.
Lovastatin		Altocor, Altoprev, Mevacor	Naturally occurring, fermentation-derived compound. It is found in oyster mushrooms and red yeast rice	CYP3A4	1–3 hours.
Mevastatin		Compactin	Naturally occurring compound found in red yeast rice	CYP3A4	
Pitavastatin		Alipza, Livalo, Livazo, Pitava, Zypitamag	Synthetic	CYP2C9 and CYP2C8 (minimally)	
Pravastatin		Aplactin, Lipostat, Prasterol, Pravachol, Pravaselect, Sanaprav, Selectin, Selektine, Vasticor	Fermentation-derived (a fermentation product of bacterium Nocardia autotrophica)	Non-CYP	1–3 hours.
Rosuvastatin		Colcardiol, Colfri, Crativ, Crestor, Dilivas, Exorta, Koleros, Lipidover, Miastina, Provisacor, Rosastin, Simestat, Staros	Synthetic	CYP2C9 and CYP2C19	14–19 hours.
Simvastatin		Alpheus, Corvatas, Krustat, Lipenil, Lipex, Liponorm, Medipo, Omistat, Rosim, Setorilin, Simbatrix, Sincol, Sinvacor, Sinvalip, Sivastin, Sinvat, Vastgen, Vastin, Xipocol, Zocor	Fermentation-derived (simvastatin is a synthetic derivate of a fermentation product of Aspergillus terreus)	CYP3A4	1–3 hours.
Atorvastatin + amlodipine		Caduet, Envacar	Combination therapy: statin + calcium antagonist		
Atorvastatin + perindopril + amlodipine		Lipertance, Triveram	Combination therapy: statin + ACE inhibitor + calcium antagonist		
Lovastatin + niacin extended-release		Advicor, Mevacor	Combination therapy		
Rosuvastatin + ezetimibe		Cholecomb, Delipid Plus, Росулип плюс, Rosulip, Rosumibe, Viazet	Combination therapy: statin + cholesterol absorption inhibitor		
Simvastatin + ezetimibe		Goltor, Inegy, Staticol, Vytorin, Zestan, Zevistat	Combination therapy: statin + cholesterol absorption inhibitor		
Simvastatin + niacin extended-release		Simcor, Simcora	Combination therapy		

LDL-lowering potency varies between agents. Cerivastatin is the most potent (withdrawn from the market in August 2001 due to risk of serious rhabdomyolysis), followed by (in order of decreasing potency) rosuvastatin, atorvastatin, simvastatin, lovastatin, pravastatin, and fluvastatin. The relative potency of pitavastatin has not yet been fully established, but preliminary studies indicate a potency similar to rosuvastatin.

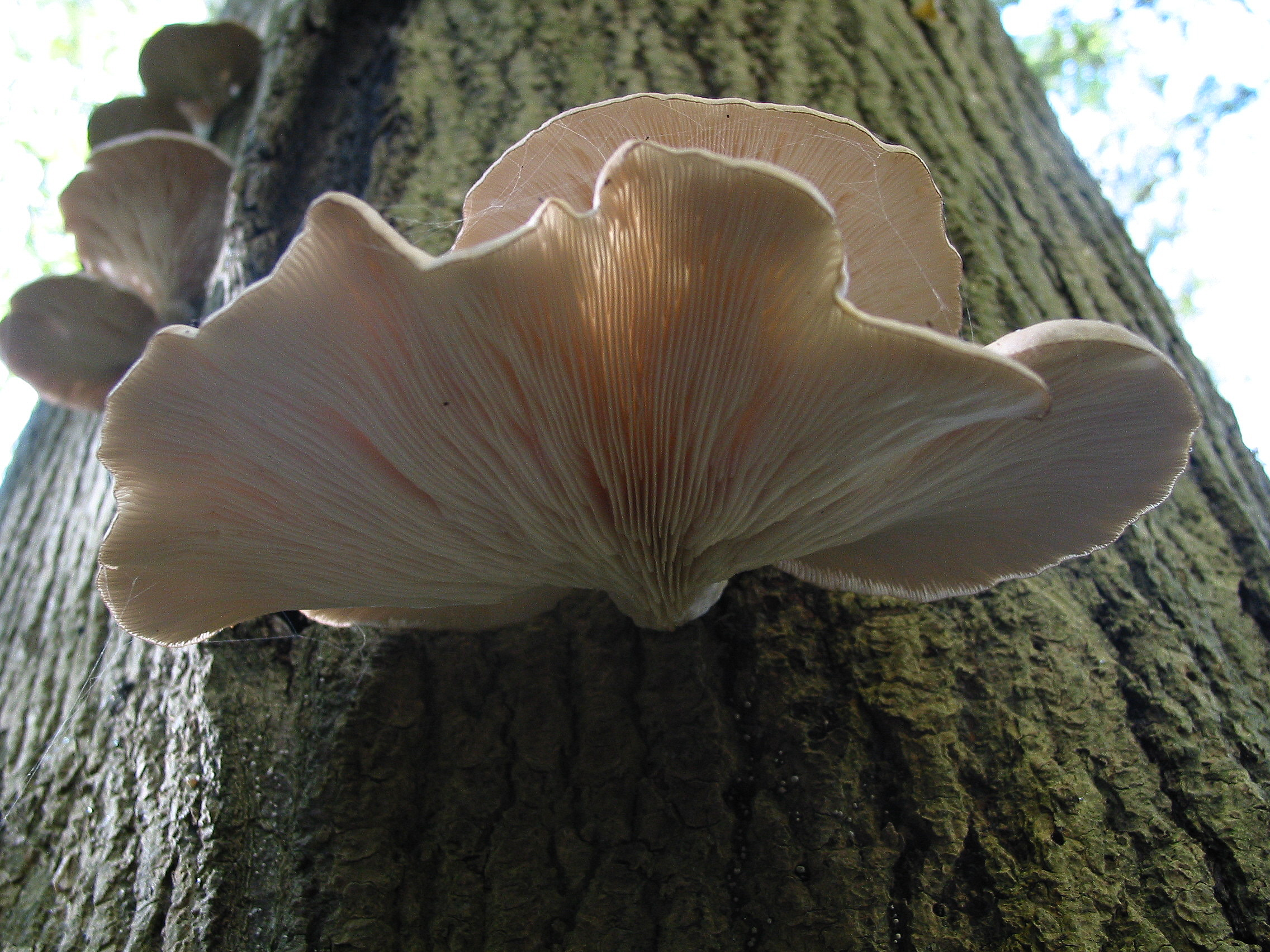
The oyster mushroom, a culinary mushroom, naturally contains lovastatin.

Some types of statins are naturally occurring and can be found in such foods as oyster mushrooms and red yeast rice. Randomized controlled trials have found these foodstuffs to reduce circulating cholesterol, but the quality of the trials has been judged as low. Due to patent expiration, most of the block-buster branded statins have been generic since 2012, including atorvastatin, the largest-selling branded drug.

Statin equivalent dosages
% LDL reduction (approx.)	Atorvastatin	Fluvastatin	Lovastatin	Pravastatin	Rosuvastatin	Simvastatin
10–20%	–	20 mg	10 mg	10 mg	–	5 mg
20–30%	–	40 mg	20 mg	20 mg	–	10 mg
30–40%	10 mg	80 mg	40 mg	40 mg	5 mg	20 mg
40–45%	20 mg	–	80 mg	80 mg	5–10 mg	40 mg
46–50%	40 mg	–	–	–	10–20 mg	80 mg (Note: 80 mg dose no longer recommended due to increased risk of rhabdomyolysis.)
50–55%	80 mg	–	–	–	20 mg	–
56–60%	–	–	–	–	40 mg	–
Starting dose
Starting dose	10–20 mg	20 mg	10–20 mg	40 mg	10 mg; 5 mg if hypothyroid, >65 yo, Asian	20 mg
If higher LDL reduction goal	40 mg if >45%	40 mg if >25%	20 mg if >20%	–	20 mg if LDL >190 mg/dL (4.87 mmol/L)	40 mg if >45%
Optimal timing	Anytime	Evening	With evening meals	Anytime	Anytime	Evening

== History ==
Accessibility of statins in the public health sector

The role of cholesterol in the development of cardiovascular disease was elucidated in the second half of the 20th century. This lipid hypothesis prompted attempts to reduce cardiovascular disease burden by lowering cholesterol. Treatment consisted mainly of dietary measures, such as a low-fat diet, and poorly-tolerated medicines, such as clofibrate, cholestyramine, and nicotinic acid. Cholesterol researcher Daniel Steinberg writes that while the Coronary Primary Prevention Trial of 1984 demonstrated cholesterol-lowering could significantly reduce the risk of heart attacks and angina, physicians, including cardiologists, remained largely unconvinced. Scientists in academic settings and the pharmaceutical industry began trying to develop a drug to reduce cholesterol more effectively. There were several potential targets, with 30 steps in the synthesis of cholesterol from acetyl-coenzyme A.

In 1971, Akira Endo, a Japanese biochemist working for the pharmaceutical company Sankyo, began to investigate this problem. Research had already shown cholesterol is mostly manufactured by the body in the liver with the enzyme HMG-CoA reductase. Endo and his team reasoned that certain microorganisms may produce inhibitors of the enzyme to defend themselves against other organisms, as mevalonate is a precursor of many substances required by organisms for the maintenance of their cell walls or cytoskeleton (isoprenoids). The first agent they identified was mevastatin (ML-236B), a molecule produced by the fungus Penicillium citrinum.

A British group isolated the same compound from Penicillium brevicompactum, named it compactin, and published their report in 1976. The British group mentions antifungal properties, with no mention of HMG-CoA reductase inhibition. Mevastatin was never marketed, because of its adverse effects of tumors, muscle deterioration, and sometimes death in laboratory dogs. P. Roy Vagelos, chief scientist and later CEO of Merck & Co, was interested and made several trips to Japan starting in 1975. By 1978, Merck had isolated lovastatin (mevinolin, MK803) from the fungus Aspergillus terreus, first marketed in 1987 as Mevacor.

In the 1990s, as a result of public campaigns, people in the United States became familiar with their cholesterol numbers and the difference between HDL and LDL cholesterol, and various pharmaceutical companies began producing their own statins, such as pravastatin (Pravachol), manufactured by Sankyo and Bristol-Myers Squibb. In April 1994, the results of a Merck-sponsored study, the Scandinavian Simvastatin Survival Study, were announced. Researchers tested simvastatin, later sold by Merck as Zocor, on 4,444 patients with high cholesterol and heart disease. After five years, the study concluded the patients saw a 35% reduction in their cholesterol, and their chances of dying of a heart attack were reduced by 42%. In 1995, Zocor and Mevacor both made Merck over US$1 billion.

Though he did not profit from his original discovery, Endo was awarded the 2006 Japan Prize and the Lasker-DeBakey Clinical Medical Research Award in 2008 for his pioneering research. Endo was also inducted into the National Inventors Hall of Fame in Alexandria, Virginia, in 2012. Michael S. Brown and Joseph Goldstein, who won the Nobel Prize for related work on cholesterol, said of Endo: "The millions of people whose lives will be extended through statin therapy owe it all to Akira Endo."

As of 2016, misleading claims exaggerating the adverse effects of statins had received widespread media coverage, with a consequent negative impact on public health and pharmaceutical profits. Controversy over the effectiveness of statins in the medical literature was amplified in popular media in the early 2010s, leading an estimated 200,000 people in the UK to stop using statins over six months to mid 2016, according to the authors of a study funded by the British Heart Foundation. They estimated that there could be up to 2,000 extra heart attacks or strokes over the following 10 years as a consequence. An unintended effect of the academic statin controversy has been the spread of scientifically questionable alternative therapies. Cardiologist Steven Nissen at Cleveland Clinic commented "We are losing the battle for the hearts and minds of our patients to Web sites..." promoting unproven medical therapies. Harriet Hall sees a spectrum of "statin denialism" ranging from pseudoscientific claims to the understatement of benefits and overstatement of side effects, all of which is contrary to the scientific evidence.

Several statins have been approved as generic drugs in the United States:

- Lovastatin (Mevacor) in December 2001
- Pravastatin (Pravachol) in April 2006
- Simvastatin (Zocor) in June 2006
- Atorvastatin (Lipitor) in November 2011
- Fluvastatin (Lescol) in April 2012
- Pitavastatin (Livalo) and rosuvastatin (Crestor) in 2016
- Ezetimibe/simvastatin (Vytorin) and ezetimibe/atorvastatin (Liptruzet) in 2017

== Research ==
Clinical studies have been conducted on the use of statins in dementia, lung cancer, nuclear cataracts, hypertension, and prostate cancer and breast cancer. There is no high quality evidence that statins are useful for pneumonia. The small number of available trials do not support the use of statins as an adjunctive therapy or as a monotherapy in multiple sclerosis.

Statins show an effect in reducing depressive symptoms post-myocardial infarction when used alongside standard antidepressants, though they are not effective as standalone treatments.

A modelling study in the UK found that people aged 70 and older who take statins live longer in good health than those who do not, regardless of whether they have cardiovascular disease.
