= Low-density lipoprotein receptor gene family =

Low-density lipoprotein receptor domain class A
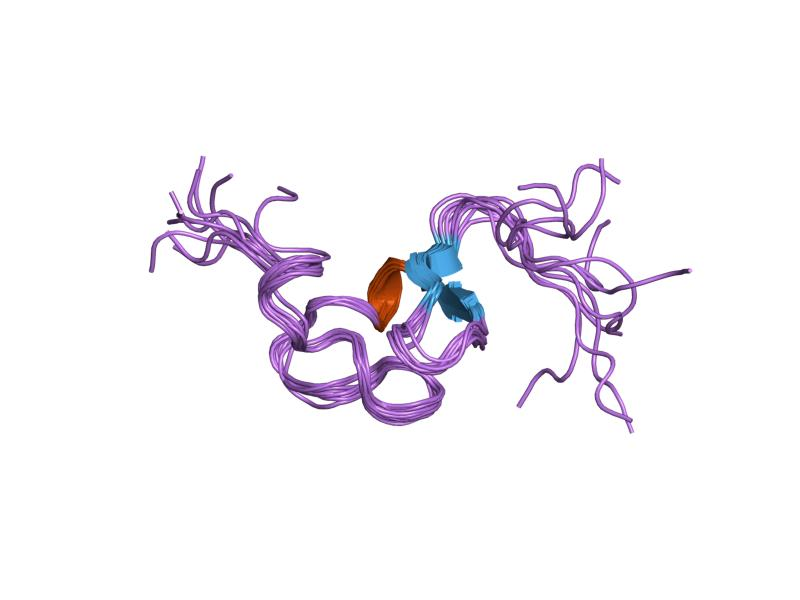
- Structure of a cysteine-rich repeat from the low-density lipoprotein receptor.

Identifiers
- Symbol: Ldl_recept_a
- Pfam: PF00057
- InterPro: IPR002172
- SMART: SM00192
- PROSITE: PS50068
- SCOP2: 1ldl / SCOPe / SUPFAM
- Membranome: 5
Available protein structures:
- PDB: IPR002172 PF00057 (ECOD; PDBsum)
- AlphaFold: IPR002172; PF00057

Low-density lipoprotein receptor domain class B
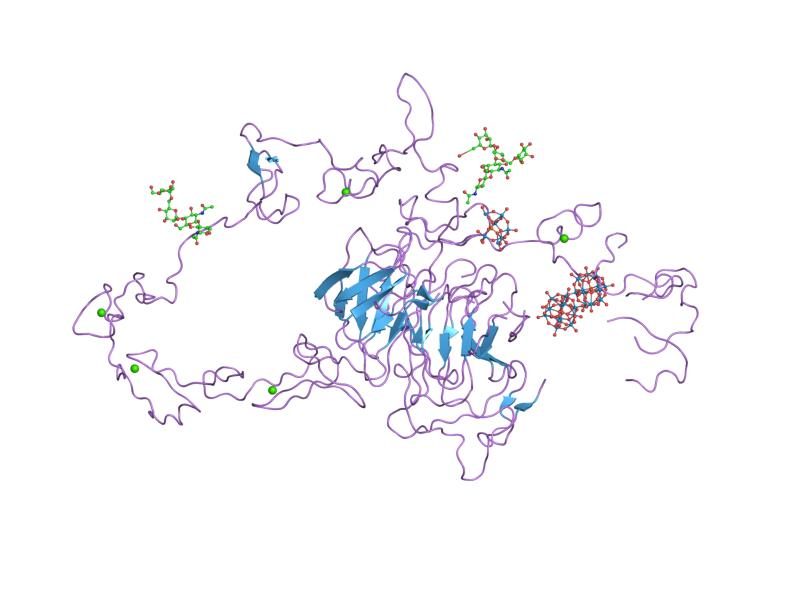
- Structure of the LDL receptor extracellular domain at endosomal pH.

Identifiers
- Symbol: Ldl_recept_b
- Pfam: PF00058
- Pfam clan: 6CL0186
- InterPro: IPR000033
- SMART: SM00135
- PROSITE: PS51120
- SCOP2: 1lrx / SCOPe / SUPFAM
Available protein structures:
- PDB: 1ijq, 1n7d, 1npe IPR000033 PF00058 (ECOD; PDBsum)
- AlphaFold: IPR000033; PF00058

The low-density lipoprotein receptor gene family codes for a class of structurally related cell surface receptors that fulfill diverse biological functions in different organs, tissues, and cell types. The role that is most commonly associated with this evolutionarily ancient family is cholesterol homeostasis (maintenance of appropriate concentration of cholesterol). In humans, excess cholesterol in the blood is captured by low-density lipoprotein (LDL) and removed by the liver via endocytosis of the LDL receptor. Recent evidence indicates that the members of the LDL receptor gene family are active in the cell signalling pathways between specialized cells in many, if not all, multicellular organisms.

There are seven members of the LDLR family in mammals, namely:

- LDLR
- VLDL receptor (VLDLR)
- ApoER2, or LRP8
- Low density lipoprotein receptor-related protein 4
  - also known as multiple epidermal growth factor (EGF) repeat-containing protein (MEGF7)
- LDLR-related protein 1
- LDLR-related protein 1b
- Megalin.

== Human proteins containing this domain ==
Listed below are human proteins containing low-density lipoprotein receptor domains:

=== Class A ===
C6; C7; 8A; 8B; C9; CD320; CFI; CORIN; DGCR2; HSPG2; LDLR; LDLRAD2; LDLRAD3; LRP1; LRP10; LRP11; LRP12; LRP1B; LRP2; LRP3; LRP4; LRP5; LRP6; LRP8; MAMDC4; MFRP; PRSS7; RXFP1; RXFP2; SORL1; SPINT1; SSPO; ST14; TMPRSS4; TMPRSS6; TMPRSS7; TMPRSS9 (serase-1B); VLDLR;

=== Class B ===
EGF; LDLR; LRP1; LRP10; LRP1B; LRP2; LRP4; LRP5; LRP5L; LRP6; LRP8; NID1; NID2; SORL1; VLDLR;

== See also ==
- Soluble low-density lipoprotein receptor-related protein (sLRP) - impaired function is related to Alzheimer's disease.

== Structure ==
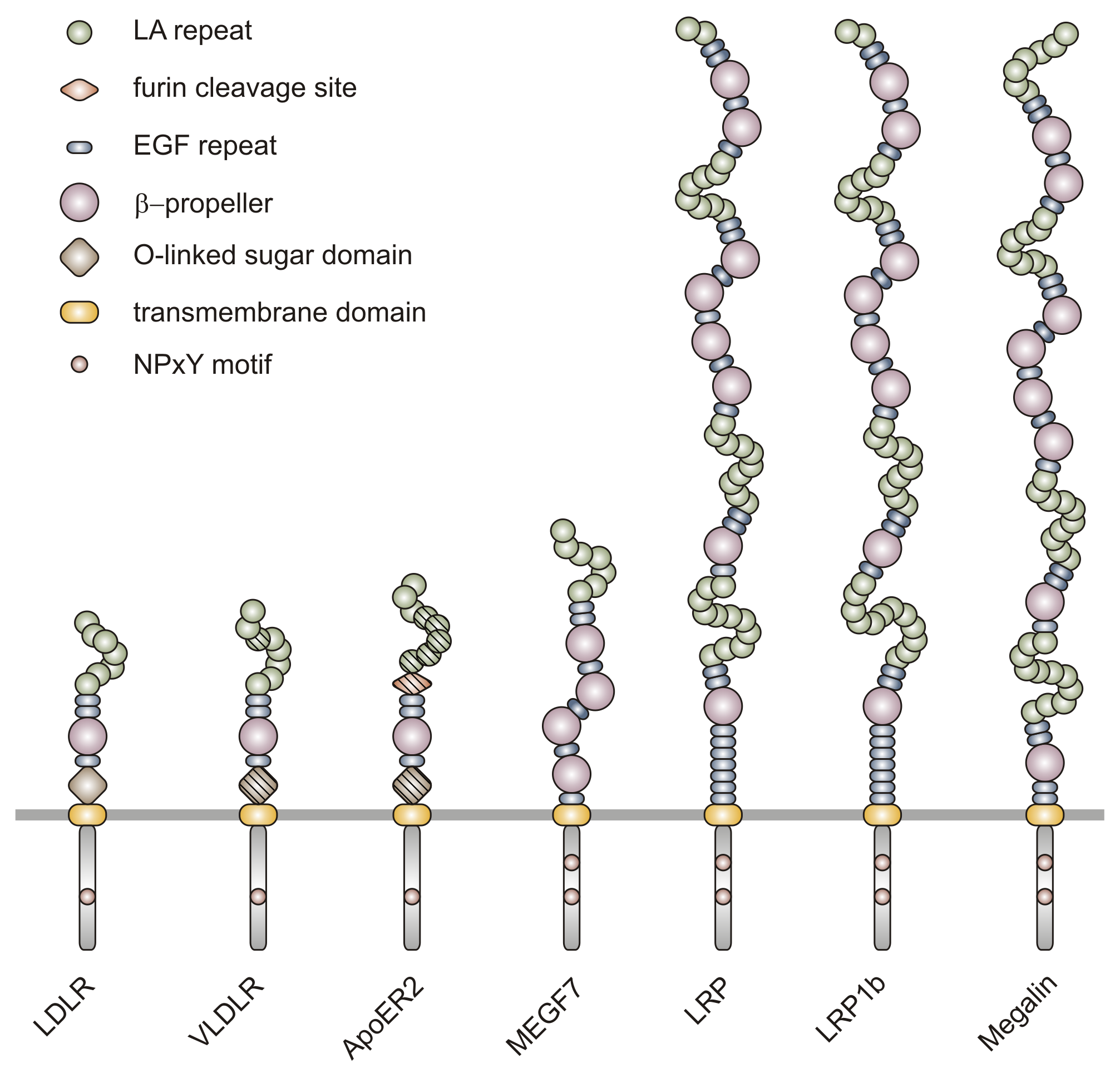
Modular structure of LDL receptor family members. Domains depicted hatched are differentially spliced and occur in some receptor isoforms only

The members of the LDLR family are characterized by distinct functional domains present in characteristic numbers. These modules are:

- LDL receptor type A (LA) repeats of 40 residues each, displaying a triple-disulfide-bond-stabilized negatively charged surface; certain head-to-tail combinations of these repeats are believed to specify ligand interactions;
- LDL receptor type B repeats, also known as EGF precursor homology regions, containing EGF-like repeats and YWTD beta propeller domains;
- a transmembrane domain, and
- the cytoplasmic region with (a) signal(s) for receptor internalization via coated pits, containing the consensus tetrapeptide Asn-Pro-Xaa-Tyr (NPxY). This cytoplasmic tail controls both endocytosis and signaling by interacting with the phosphotyrosine binding (PTB) domain-containing proteins.

In addition to these domains which can be found in all receptors of the gene family, LDL receptor and certain isoforms of ApoER2 and VLDLR contain a short region which can undergo O-linked glycosylation, known as O-linked sugar domain. ApoER2 moreover, can harbour a cleavage site for the protease furin between type A and type B repeats which enables production of a soluble receptor fragment by furin-mediated processing.
