= Lipoprotein receptor-related protein =

Protein family

Lipoprotein receptor-related proteins, low-density lipoprotein receptor-related proteins (HGNC), or pro-low-density lipoprotein receptor-related protein (UniProt), abbreviated LRP, are a group of proteins.

They include:

- LRP1
- LRP1B
- LRP2 (megalin)
- LRP3
- LRP4
- LRP5
- LRP6
- LRP8, apolipoprotein e receptor
- LRP10
- LRP11
- LRP12: mutations associated with oculopharyngodistal myopathy

== See also ==
- LRPAP1 (low density lipoprotein receptor-related protein associated protein 1)

Lipoprotein receptor-related proteins are co-receptors for Wnt signaling.
