= Blood lipids =

Lipids in the blood, either free or bound to other molecules

Blood lipids (or blood fats) are lipids in the blood, either free or bound to other molecules. They are mostly transported in a phospholipid capsule, and the type of protein embedded in this outer shell determines the fate of the particle and its influence on metabolism. Examples of these lipids include cholesterol and triglycerides. The concentration of blood lipids depends on intake and excretion from the intestine, and uptake and secretion from cells. Hyperlipidemia is the presence of elevated or abnormal levels of lipids and/or lipoproteins in the blood, and is a major risk factor for cardiovascular disease.

== Fatty acids ==
=== Intestine intake ===
Short- and medium chain fatty acids are absorbed directly into the blood via intestine capillaries and travel through the portal vein. Long-chain fatty acids, on the other hand, are too large to be directly released into the tiny intestine capillaries. Instead they are coated with a membrane composed of phospholipids and proteins, forming a large transporter particle called chylomicron. The chylomicron enters a lymphatic capillary, then it is transported into the bloodstream at the left subclavian vein (having bypassed the liver).

In any case, the concentration of blood fatty acids increase temporarily after a meal.

=== Cell uptake ===
After a meal, when the blood concentration of fatty acids rises, there is an increase in uptake of fatty acids in different cells of the body, mainly liver cells, adipocytes and muscle cells. This uptake is stimulated by insulin from the pancreas. As a result, the blood concentration of fatty acid stabilizes again after a meal.

=== Cell secretion ===
After a meal, some of the fatty acids taken up by the liver is converted into very low density lipoproteins (VLDL) and again secreted into the blood.

In addition, when a long time has passed since the last meal, the concentration of fatty acids in the blood decreases, which triggers adipocytes to release stored fatty acids into the blood as free fatty acids, in order to supply e.g. muscle cells with energy.

In any case, also the fatty acids secreted from cells are anew taken up by other cells in the body, until entering fatty acid metabolism.

== Cholesterol ==
The fate of cholesterol in the blood is highly determined by its constitution of lipoproteins, where some types favour transport towards body tissues and others towards the liver for excretion into the intestines.

The 1987 report of National Cholesterol Education Program, Adult Treatment Panels suggest the total blood cholesterol level should be: <200 mg/dl normal blood cholesterol, 200–239 mg/dl borderline-high, >240 mg/dl high cholesterol.

The average amount of blood cholesterol varies with age, typically rising gradually until one is about 60 years old. There appear to be seasonal variations in cholesterol levels in humans, more, on average, in winter. These seasonal variations seem to be inversely linked to vitamin C intake.

=== Intestine intake ===
In lipid digestion, cholesterol is packed into chylomicrons in the small intestine, which are delivered to the portal vein and lymph. The chylomicrons are ultimately taken up by liver hepatocytes via interaction between apolipoprotein E and the LDL receptor or lipoprotein receptor-related proteins.

=== In lipoproteins ===
Cholesterol is minimally soluble in water; it cannot dissolve and travel in the water-based bloodstream. Instead, it is transported in the bloodstream by lipoproteins that are water-soluble and carry cholesterol and triglycerides internally. The apolipoproteins forming the surface of the given lipoprotein particle determine from what cells cholesterol will be removed and to where it will be supplied.

The largest lipoproteins, which primarily transport fats from the intestinal mucosa to the liver, are called chylomicrons. They carry mostly fats in the form of triglycerides. In the liver, chylomicron particles release triglycerides and some cholesterol. The liver converts unburned food metabolites into very low density lipoproteins (VLDL) and secretes them into plasma where they are converted to intermediate-density lipoproteins(IDL), which thereafter are converted to low-density lipoprotein (LDL) particles and non-esterified fatty acids, which can affect other body cells. In healthy individuals, most of the LDL particles are large and buoyant (less dense, also known as lb-LDL) and they are cardiovascularly neutral: they have no negative and no positive effect on cardiovascular health. In contrast, large numbers of small and dense LDL (sd-LDL) particles are strongly associated with the presence of atheromatous disease within the arteries. For this reason, total LDL is referred to as "bad cholesterol," although only a fraction of it is actually bad.

Standard chemistry panels typically include total triglyceride, LDL and HDL levels in the blood. Measuring the concentration of sd-LDL is expensive. However, since it is produced from VLDL, it can be inferred indirectly by estimating VLDL levels in the blood. That estimate is typically obtained by measuring triglyceride levels after at least eight hours of fasting, when chylomicrons have been totally removed from the blood by the liver. In the absence of chylomicrons, triglyceride levels have a much larger correlation with risk of cardiovascular diseases than total LDL levels.

=== Intestine excretion ===
After being transported to the liver by HDL, cholesterol is delivered to the intestines via bile production. However, 92-97% is reabsorbed in the intestines and recycled via enterohepatic circulation.

=== Cell uptake ===
Cholesterol circulates in the blood in low-density lipoproteins and these are taken into the cell by LDL receptor-mediated endocytosis in clathrin-coated pits, and then hydrolysed in lysosomes.

=== Cell secretion ===
In response to low blood cholesterol, different cells of the body, mainly in the liver and intestines, start to synthesize cholesterol from acetyl-CoA by the enzyme HMG-CoA reductase. This is then released into the blood.

== Related medical conditions ==
=== Hyperlipidemia ===
Hyperlipidemia is the presence of elevated or abnormal levels of lipids and/or lipoproteins in the blood.

Lipid and lipoprotein abnormalities are extremely common in the general population, and are regarded as a highly modifiable risk factor for cardiovascular disease. In addition, some forms may predispose to acute pancreatitis. One of the most clinically relevant lipid substances is cholesterol, especially on atherosclerosis and cardiovascular disease. The presence of high levels of cholesterol in the blood is called hypercholesterolemia.

Hyperlipoproteinemia is elevated levels of lipoproteins.

=== Hypercholesterolemia ===
Hypercholesterolemia is the presence of high levels of cholesterol in the blood. It is not a disease but a metabolic derangement that can be secondary to many diseases and can contribute to many forms of disease, most notably cardiovascular disease. Familial hypercholesterolemia is a rare genetic disorder that can occur in families, where sufferers cannot properly metabolise cholesterol.

=== Hypocholesterolemia ===
Abnormally low levels of cholesterol are called hypocholesterolemia.

== See also ==
- Lipid hypothesis
