= LX1001 =

Experimental gene therapy

LX1001 is an experimental gene therapy for Alzheimer's disease associated with mutations to the APOE4 gene. The gene therapy is delivered via adeno-associated virus injected into the spinal canal and is intended to increase the expression of APOE2.
