= Alzheimer's disease in the Hispanic/Latino population =

Alzheimer's disease (AD) in the Hispanic/Latino population is becoming a topic of interest in AD research as Hispanics and Latinos are disproportionately affected by Alzheimer's Disease and underrepresented in clinical research. AD is a neurodegenerative disease, characterized by the presence of amyloid-beta plaques and neurofibrillary tangles, that causes memory loss and cognitive decline in its patients. However, pathology and symptoms have been shown to manifest differently in Hispanic/Latinos, as different neuroinflammatory markers are expressed and cognitive decline is more pronounced. Additionally, there is a large genetic component of AD, with mutations in the amyloid precursor protein (APP), apolipoprotein E APOE), presenilin 1 (PSEN1), bridging Integrator 1 (BIN1), SORL1, and clusterin (CLU) genes increasing one's risk to develop the condition. However, research has shown these high-risk genes have a different effect on Hispanics and Latinos then they do in other racial and ethnic groups. Additionally, this population experiences higher rates of comorbidities, that increase their risk of developing AD. Hispanics and Latinos also face socioeconomic and cultural factors, such as low income and a language barrier, that affect their ability to engage in clinical trials and receive proper care.

== Alzheimer's disease ==
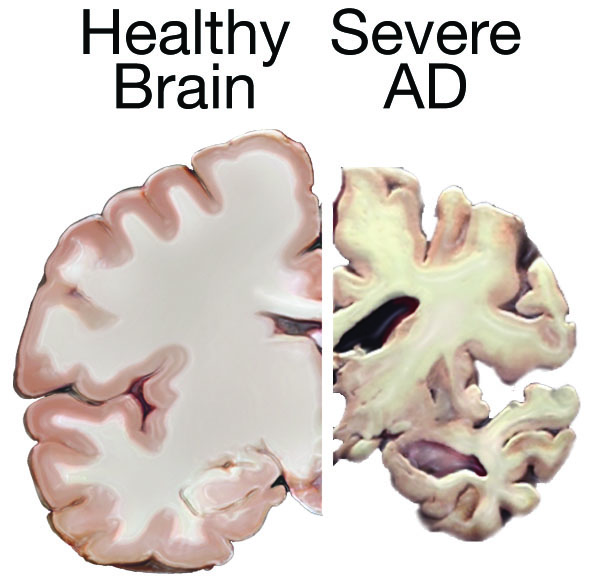
A healthy brain (left) and a late-stage Alzheimer's brain (right)

Alzheimer's disease is the most common form of dementia, accounting for 60% of all cases, and is the sixth leading cause of death in the elderly. The disease typically presents itself with intracellular aggregation of hyper-phosphorylated tau, forming neurofibrillary tangles (NFTs), and the extracellular aggregation of amyloid beta (Aβ), forming neuritic plaques. As of 2020, 5.4 million Americans have been diagnosed with Alzheimer's disease, and this number is projected to reach 15-22 million by 2050. Hispanics and Latinos account for 55 million of the population and this population is projected to rise to 97 million, accounting for 25% of the U.S. population, in 2050.

=== Hispanic/Latino population ===
Hispanics and Latinos make up 18% of the U.S. population, however, they are underrepresented in clinical research. The National Institute of Health (NIH) reported that Hispanic and Latinos accounted for less than 8% of reported clinical trial participants. One proposed reason for the lack of representation is that the Hispanic/Latino population includes many people from different countries, and with this diverse background come different characteristics and comorbidities associated with AD. Hispanic and Latinos have a higher prevalence of AD compared to White non-Hispanics. Studies estimate that 12% of older Hispanic and Latino adults were diagnosed with AD, the highest proportion compared to all other ethnic groups. Hispanic and Latinos are the fastest-growing population in the U.S., and Hispanic/Latino seniors, those who are 65 and older, are expected to have the largest rise in AD and dementia cases compared to other populations, reaching 3.5 million by 2060. In 2011 the National Alzheimer's Disease Project Act was signed into law. The goal of this act was for The National Institute of Aging to accelerate research and clinical care of patients with AD; this act also has the benefit of seeking to improve the inclusion of underrepresented populations in AD research and clinical trials. This neurodegenerative disease varies across all ethnic groups. Studies show that Latinos are up to one-and-a-half times more likely to develop Alzheimer's than non-Latino whites.

=== Types ===
There exist two types of Alzheimer's disease: familial Alzheimer's disease, also called early-onset Alzheimer's disease (EOAD), and sporadic Alzheimer's disease, also called late-onset Alzheimer's disease (LOAD). EOAD is the less common of the two, accounting for 5-10%, and patients with EOAD are typically diagnosed with familial AD before they turn 65 years old. LOAD is more common and accounts for 90% of AD cases and its patients experience onset after they turn 65. EOAD has been shown to have 2 types of inheritance patterns: mendelian (mEOAD) and non-mendelian (nmEOAD, sporadic) patterns. The three main genes that implicated in familial AD are amyloid precursor protein (APP), Presenilin-1 (PSEN-1), presenilin-2 (PSEN-2). Onset of sporadic AD has both genetic and environmental risk factors. Some genes of interest in LOAD are the APOE gene, specifically the ApoE4 allele, bridging Integrator 1 (BIN1), SORL1, and clusterin (CLU).

=== Pathology and symptoms ===
==== Amyloid beta plaques and neurofibrillary tangles ====
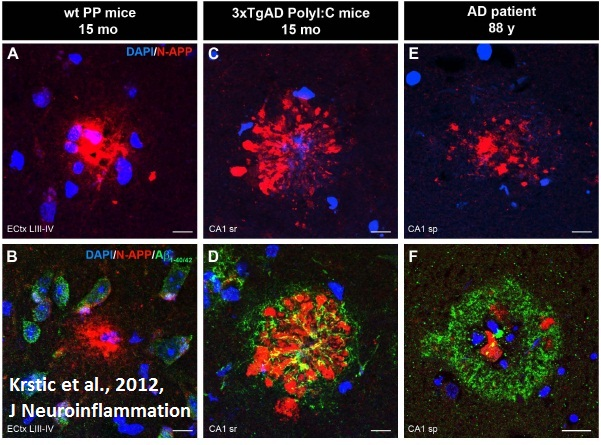
Comparing the formation of the plaques, as a result of neuroinflammation, between wild-type (PP) mice, AD-transgenic mice (3xTgAD), and AD patients. The inflammation-induced accumulation of APP fragments (red) represents the seeding point for the aggregation of Amyloid-beta peptides (green).

Neuritic plaques and neurofibrillary Tangles (NFTs) are the main pathological component of AD. Neuritic plaques are composed mainly of the peptide Aβ, but also include other components. APP is processed through either of two pathways, the first is termed the amyloidogenic pathway and produces Aβ. The second pathway is the non-amyloidogenic pathway and does not produce Aβ. In the amyloidogenic pathway, APP (the parent protein) is trafficked to endosomes, cleaved by beta-secretase (BACE), after which it moves back to the cell surface to be cleaved by gamma secretase thus releasing the Aβ peptide. This form of APP processing produces multiple Aβ peptides, of which Aβ40 and Aβ42 peptide are most abundantly produced. APP can also be cleaved by alpha and gamma-secretase and undergo non-amyloidogenic processing. NFTs form when the tau protein, which is involved in microtubule stability, is hyperphosphorylated, dissociates from microtubules and then aggregates with other p-tau monomers forming tau oligomers, fibrils and eventually NFTs. These types of pathologies do not differ across ethnic groups.

==== Chronic inflammation ====
Neuroinflammation is another pathological component of AD pathology, and is associated with an increase in levels of inflammatory markers. Researchers have also identified many genes linked to immune function that are risk factors for AD, such as TREM2. TREM2 are highly expressed in microglia, the immune cell of the brain, tying the progression of AD with dysfunction in microglial activity. Neuroinflammation, Aβ and tau pathologies interact in Alzheimer's disease, and their progress can be monitored with biomarkers. For example, studies have found the neuroinflammatory marker YKL-40 in the cerebrospinal fluid (CSF) of AD patients. This protein increases years before the onset of AD symptoms and correlates with other neurodegenerative biomarkers, which suggests a potential to predict disease progression. While YKL-40 has not been shown to associate with the APOE -ε4 allele, there is research to link this biomarker to AD in the Hispanic population.

==== Neurodegeneration ====
Along with the plaques and inflammation, patients with AD also suffer from neurodegeneration, characterized by loss of neurons and synapses (the communication tool for neurons). As a result, the entire brain shrinks in volume (termed brain atrophy), the ventricles grow larger, and the hippocampus and cortex shrink in size. As all these pathologies progress, patients begin to experience a decline in memory, cognitive abilities, and independence. The accumulation of neurofibrillary tangles and loss of synaptic fields correlate most closely with cognitive loss.

==== Mild cognitive impairment ====
Mild cognitive impairment (MCI) precedes the overt diagnosis of AD. To be diagnosed with MCI a patient must show memory impairment, a progressive decline in cognitive abilities without presenting symptoms of Parkinson's disease, cerebrovascular diseases, and behavioral or language disorders. Studies show that older Hispanic/Latinos exhibit a higher prevalence of dementia than caucasians. Demographic and linguistic factors can prevent a proper MCI diagnosis. For instance, subjects for whom English might not be the primary language require use of a translator to perform the cognitive testing, which could affect testing results, but such experimental weaknesses are frequently not described.

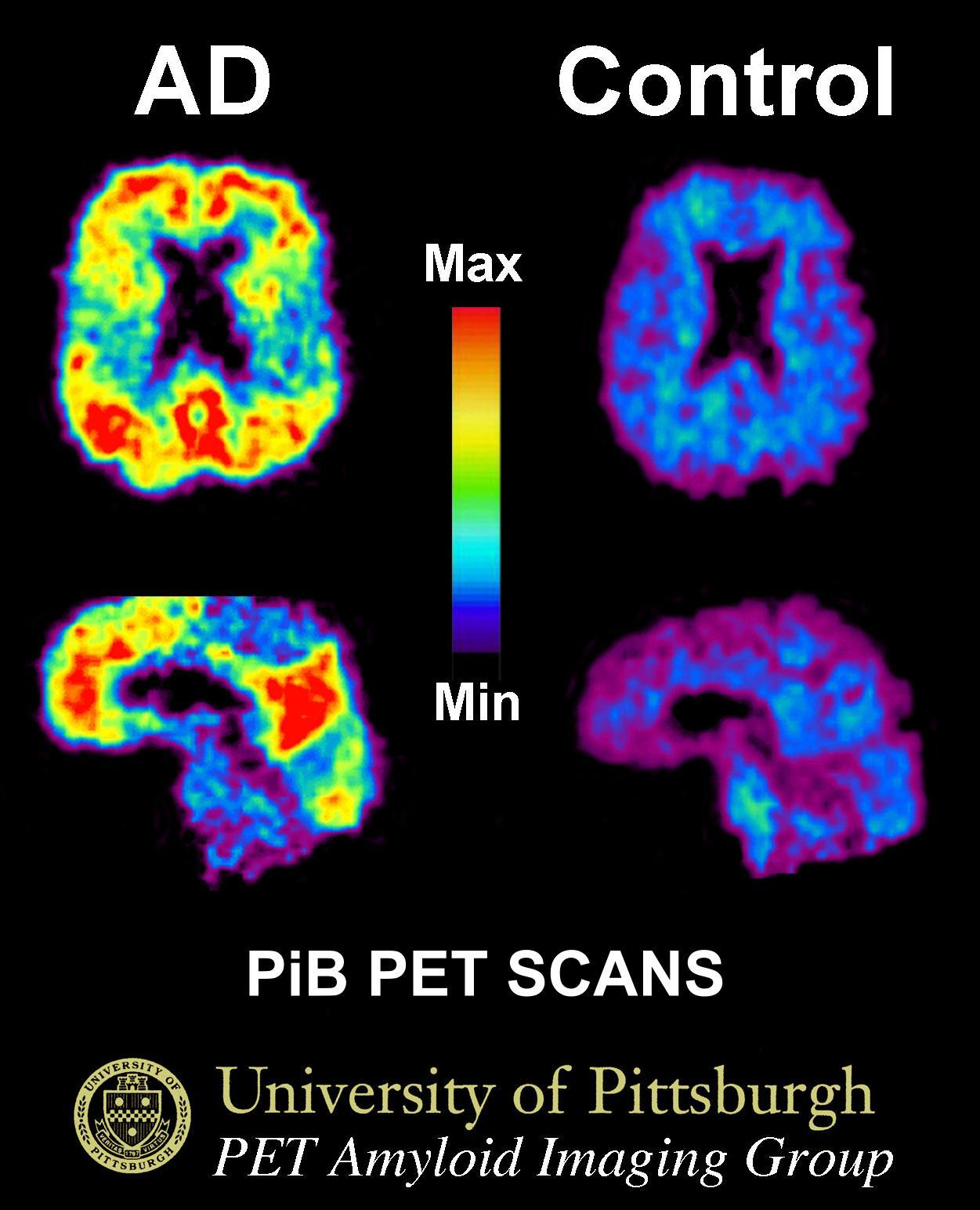
PiB-PET scan of an AD patient (left) compared to an age-matched control (right). Pittsburgh Compound B (PIB) is easily taken up into the brains of AD patients and is used to detect Amyloid beta. Brain regions that are colored red and yellow correspond to a high concentration of PiB, suggesting high amounts of amyloid deposit

=== Brain imaging ===
Positron emission tomography (PET) is a brain imaging technique that uses a small amount of radioactive substance, called a tracer, to measure energy use or a specific molecule in different brain regions. In AD research, tracers can be used to detect neuritic plaques (containing Aβ) and tau. Depending on the tracer used, the signal can be used to determine the presence of neuritic plaques and NFTs.

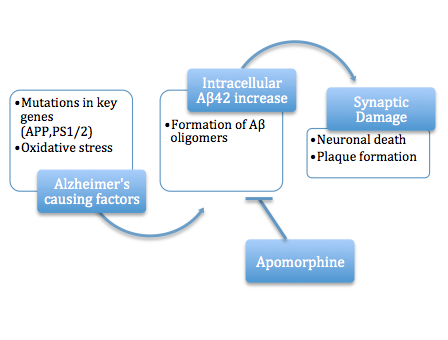
The role of genetic mutations in Alzheimer's Disease

=== Biomarkers ===
Establishing biomarkers for the early detection of AD is an ongoing are of research because pathological changes occur years before symptoms become apparent. Common biomarkers for AD include amyloid beta and hyperphosphorylated tau, both of which can be found in brain tissue and cerebrospinal fluid (CSF). Aβ provides a biomarker of neuritic plaques, which form when APP cleavage results in an increase in the Aβ42/Aβ40 ratio. Hyperphosphorylated tau serves as a biomarker of neurofibrillary tangles (NFTs), with the presence of NFTs indicating a disruption in microtubule stability and neuronal injury. Researchers have begun investigating other markers in the CSF, such as markers of neuronal injury, like Visinin-Like-Protein-1 (VILIP-1), YKL-40, and Neurogranin (NGRN). Due to the low use of CSF sampling in most countries, efforts have been made to study biomarkers in blood. Through work on blood biomarkers, researchers have been able to find proteins that are elevated in AD patients and have predictive potential. The predictive potential of these plasma markers increases further when coupled with the presence of genetic risk factors, such as the APOE E4 allele. Examples of plasma biomarkers include interleukin, TGF, and micro-RNA.

Genetic risk factors being considered for integration with biomarkers includes ApoE, PSEN1, Bin1, CLU, and SORL1.

==== APOE gene ====
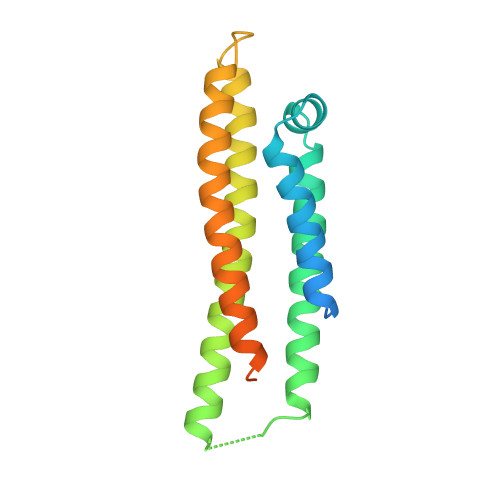
A 22K fragment of the APOE4 protein (IB68).

Apolipoprotein E (APOE) is a lipoprotein, composed of 299 amino acids, that is expressed throughout the body but particularly important in the brain where it is involved in cholesterol metabolism, specifically in the intracellular and extracellular transport, delivery, and distribution. APOE associates with high-density lipoproteins (HDL). The gene for APOE is located on chromosome 19 and exhibits polymorphisms in the population defined by three alleles of APOE: 𝜀2, 𝜀3, and 𝜀4. These alleles differ by only two single nucleotide polymorphisms in exon 4, rs429358 and rs7412 (amino-acid position 112 and 158). APOE𝜀3 is the more common of the three and is present in 50-90% of the general population. APOE 𝜀4 is the most common risk factor for LOAD, increasing genetic risk up to 33-fold, depending on the population (see the table below). Over 50% of LOAD patients have the 𝜀4 allele and that having even one copy of the 𝜀4 allele increases the risk of developing Alzheimer's by a factor of 4. APOE 𝜀2 has been shown to have a neuroprotective effect with carriers of the allele showing a lower prevalence of AD. The neuropathological effects of APOE ε4 are pleiotropic; APOE ε4 impairs uptake of cholesterol by neurons, promotes microglial dysfunction, promotes beta-amyloid aggregation and is increases cerebral angiopathy (CAA). The increased incidence of AD associated with the APOE ε4 allele has been proposed to be directly linked to Aβ because it modulates Aβ aggregation and clearance, although increasing evidence points to a multitude of actions.

The risk of developing AD with two copies of the APOE𝜀4 allele across various racial-ethnic groups
| Population | APOE𝜀4 Association with AD |
|---|---|
| Caucasian | 12.5 |
| African Americans | 5.7 |
| Hispanic | 2.2 |
| Japanese | 33.1 |

While extensive research has been done on the APOE4 gene, more information is available for caucasians than for other ethnic and racial groups. The research focusing on the Hispanic and Latino population, suggests that race is a key variable in assessing the risk of carrying the APOE ε4 allele in developing AD. Genetic studies of Hispanic and Latino populations, show a lower risk of developing AD for individuals with the APOE ε4 than observed in Caucasians. For instance, the prevalence of AD seen in Caribbean Hispanics, compared to White Non-Hispanics, appears to be independent of APOE genotype. Our understanding of ApoE ε4 continues to evolve, though, as Hispanic and Latino representation in research increases leading to larger sample sizes and improved population stratification .

==== PSEN1 gene ====
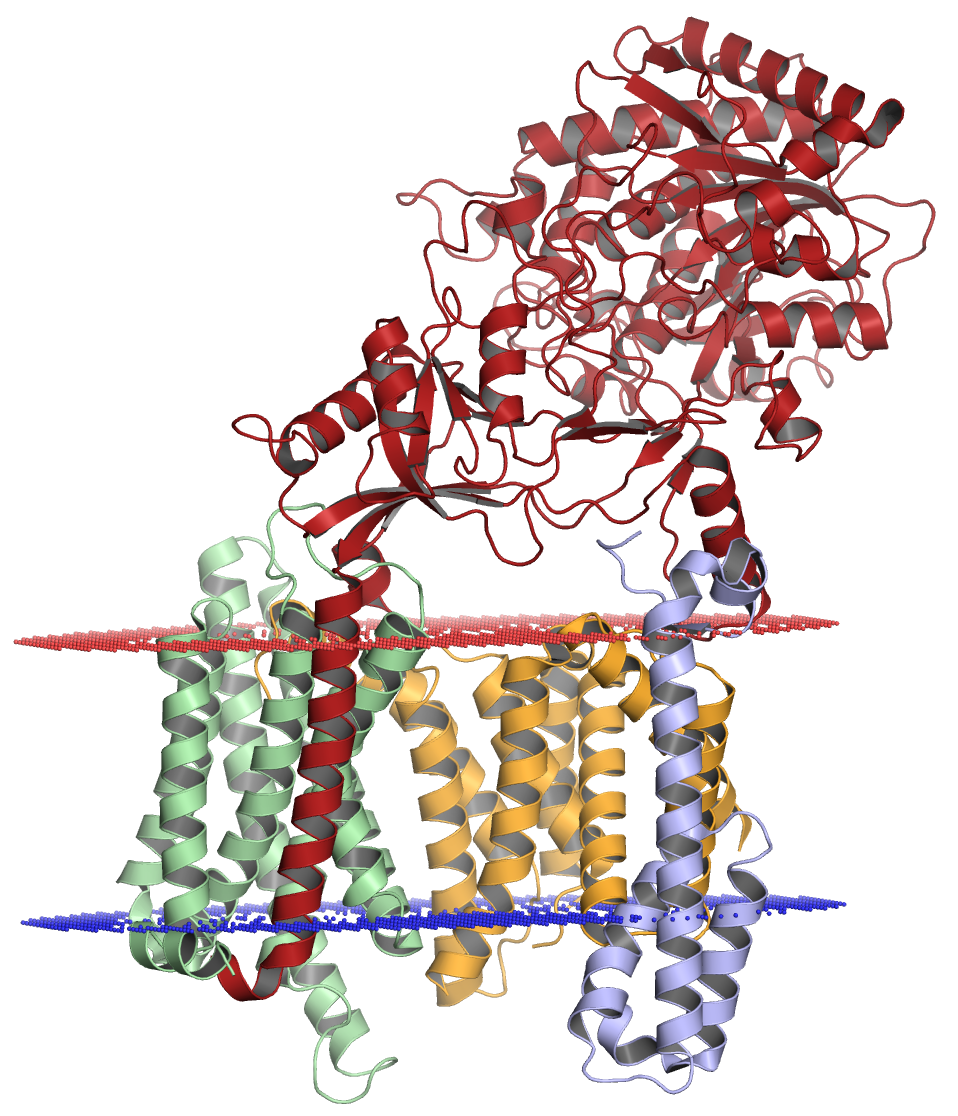
The human gamma-secretase protein complex imaged using cryo-electron microscopy. The structure contains nicastrin (red), presenilin-1 (orange), PEN-2 (blue), and APH-1 (green). This is a transmembrane protein complex that processes amyloid precursor protein (APP) to Aβ peptide.

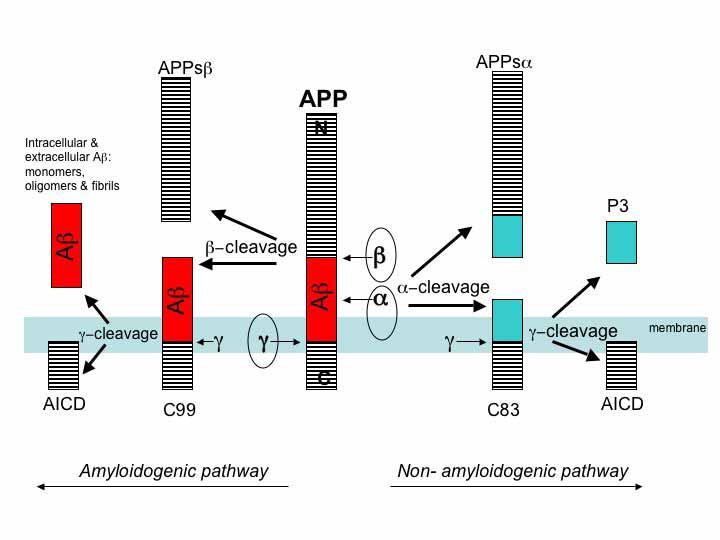
The processing of APP by α, β and γ-secretases

Presenilin 1 (PSEN1) is the catalytic subunit of the transmembrane protein complex gamma-secretase. This protein cleaves amyloid precursor protein (APP), after beta-secretase cleavage, to produce Amyloid beta. The gene for PSEN1 is located on chromosome 14, q24.2, and consists of 12 exons that encode a 467-amino-acid protein that is predicted to traverse the membrane 9 times. Over 200 pathogenic mutations of this protein exist, many of which account for 18% to 50% of autosomal dominant EOAD cases. PSEN1 mutations increase the risk of developing AD by increasing the production of amyloid beta-42, compared to amyloid beta-40. Unlike APOE4, PSEN1 mutations tend to have a clear pathological effect in Hispanics and Latinos and tend to express region-specific mutations. Puerto Ricans have a G206A mutation that causes familial AD, Cuban families diagnosed with EAOD commonly exhibit a L174M, mutation, Mexican families exhibit L171P and A431E mutations, and Colombian families exhibit an E280A mutation (particularly in the municipality of Yarumal).

==== BIN1 gene ====
Bridging Integrator 1 (BIN1) is a widely expressed Bin-Amphiphysin-Rvs (BAR) adaptor protein that is located on chromosome 2, q14.3, and contains 20 exons. BIN1 mainly regulates clathrin-mediated endocytosis. Due to a large number of exons, this gene is subject to alternative splicing, with the major forms varying in the splicing of exons 6a, 10, 12, and 13. Genetic studies indicate that dysfunction in BIN1 is the second most important risk factor for AD. The mechanism through which BIN1 contributes to AD, though, is unclear. Studies suggest a range of possible reasons that BIN1 is associated with AD including interactions of BIN1 with the microtubule-associated proteins (i.e. CLIP170), endosomal trafficking of APP and APOE by BIN1, and BIN1 mediated regulation of inflammation through the expression of indoleamine 2,3-dioxygenase (IDO1). The interaction of BIN1 and tau might also be important because elevated levels of BIN1 are associated with increased AD risk through tau load; this result is suggested because of studies of the functional rs59335482 variant. Additionally, endocytic trafficking of APP by BIN1 could be important because trafficking determines if APP will undergo the non-amyloidogenic or the amyloidogenic pathway. For example, if APP is transported to the endosome, it will likely be cleaved by beta-secretase and undergo amyloidogenic processing, but if it accumulates on the cell surface it will be likely cleaved by alpha-secretase and undergo non-amyloidogenic processing. Lastly, BIN1 facilitates the kynurenine pathway of tryptophan metabolism by regulating the expression of the rate-limiting enzyme indoleamine 2,3-dioxygenase (IDO1). For the IDO1 mechanism, increased BIN1 expression could increase levels of a toxic tryptophan derivative IDO1. These metabolites have been suggested to be involved in AD pathology and cognitive decline, as they co-localize with the plaques and NFTs in patient brains.

Genome-wide association studies (GWAS) in the Hispanic/Latino population indicate that polymorphisms in the BIN1, ABAC7 and CD2AP genes are more significant in Caribbean Hispanics. For instance, one BIN1 mutation that has been explored in this Caribbean Hispanics is rs13426725. Other variants that increase the risk of AD include rs6733839.

==== SORL1 gene ====
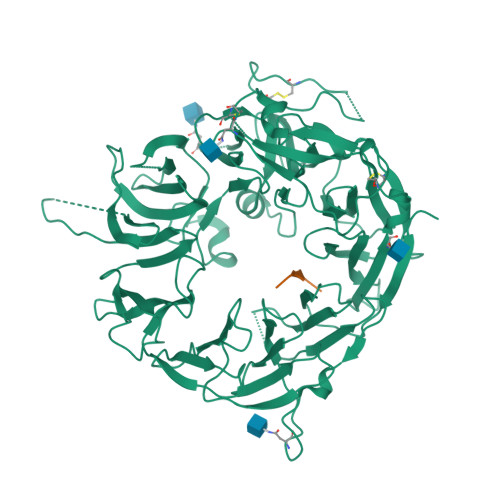
The X-ray crystallography structure of human SORL1 in complex with A-beta derived peptide

Sortilin-related receptor 1 (SORL1) is a 250-kDa membrane protein with seven distinct domains that make it a member of two receptor families: the low-density lipoprotein receptor (LDLR) family of ApoE receptors and the vacuolar protein sorting 10 (VPS10) domain receptor family. In humans, the SORL1 gene is located on chromosome 11, specifically q232-q24.2. As a protein SORL1 is highly expressed in the brain. SORL1 is an intracellular protein that is expressed in early endosomes and the trans-Golgi network. SORL1 plays an important role in the intracellular trafficking of APP. The protein can bind to APP expressed in endosomes and allow APP to be transported back to the cell surface, which prevents amyloidogenic processing and the production of cytotoxic Aβ40 and Aβ42. Moreover, SORL1 has been shown to facilitate cholesterol transport through its tendency to bind to APOE-lipoprotein complexes. Strong disease-linked polymorphisms in SORL1 combine with its role in APP trafficking render SORL1 a biomarker of strong interest for LOAD. Decreased levels of SORL1 transcript and protein have been observed in the brains of AD patients.

Analysis of SORL1 polymorphisms in the Hispanic/Latino population using GWAS and whole-genome sequencing (WGS) have shown that several SORL1 mutations are seen in Caribbean Hispanics. Two rare polymorphisms in SORL1 associated with AD were observed in this population, rs117260922-E270K and rs143571823-T947M, as well as a common variant (rs2298813-A528T) . These polymorphisms are not specific to Hispanics/Latinos as they are also observed in non-Hispanic white individuals.

==== ATP binding cassette transporters ====
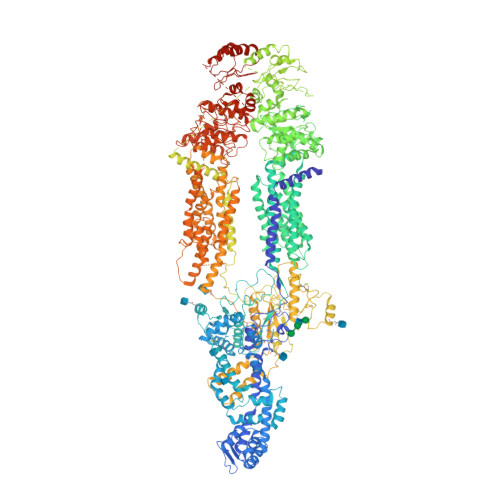
The Cryo-EM structure of Human ABCA1

Adenosine triphosphate (ATP)-binding cassette transporters are a large family of ABC transporters that regulates the efflux of cholesterol in neuronal cells. Two members of the ATP binding cassette transporter family have been implicated in LOAD: ABC Subfamily A Member 1 (ABCA1) and ABC Subfamily A member 7 (ABCA7). ABCA1 is a 220-240 kDa protein whose gene is located in chromosome 9q31.1 Its putative role in AD is tied to its role in stabilizing ApoE lipidation and degrading amyloid beta expressed in the brain. ABCA7 exhibits strong genetic linkage to AD; it is involved in lipid and cholesterol processing, as well as immune system function. ABCA7 exhibits tighter association with amyloid deposition than ABCA1. The research on ABCA7 mutations in the Hispanic/Latino population is a bit controversial. Some studies propose that mutations in ABCA7 are more common in Caucasian patients, whereas Hispanics/Latinos are more likely to express a BIN1 mutation. But researchers have still found polymorphisms specific to this population, one example being a 44-base pair frameshift deletion in ABCA7 increases AD risk in African Americans and Caribbean Hispanics.

==== Clusterin ====
Clusterin (CLU), also known as apolipoprotein J, is an 82 kDa glycoprotein protein that is located on chromosome 8. It has multiple physiological functions, some examples being lipid transport, immune modulation, and cell death. CLU is known to have the ability to clear Aβ peptides and prevent their aggregation, which suggests that CLU has a neuroprotective effect. While one might expect AD to be associated with lower levels of a neuroprotective protein, biomarker studies indicate that CLU is upregulated in the plasma, CSF, hippocampus, and cortex of AD patients. One theory explaining this apparent contradiction is CLU is actually reduced early in life, increasing risk of developing AD. In this scenario, CLU might increase in subjects with AD as a compensatory response to the disease; further research is clearly necessary to clairy this area. However, genetic studies show that CLU is the third most significant risk factor for LOAD, which has propelled extensive genetic research related to CLU and AD. Two CLU variants of interest, that are associated with reduced AD frequency, are rs11136000 and rs9331896. However, little is known about the relationship between CLU and AD risk in the Hispanic/Latino community.

=== Comorbidities ===
Studies have shown that metabolic disorders, such as diabetes, cardiovascular disease, hypertension, obesity, and depression can increase one's risk of developing AD as well as increase the rate at which it progresses. In the United States, 33% of the total population suffers from a metabolic disorder (i.e. diabetes and hypertension). Hispanic and Latino adults are at an increased risk of developing these conditions compared to Caucasians. As of 2017, it has been reported that 35% of all Latinos suffer from an AD comorbidity, with 17% suffering from diabetes and 25.4% suffering from hypertension. The high prevalence of cardiovascular and metabolic conditions is thought to contribute to the higher risk of Alzheimer's Disease seen in Hispanics and Latinos.

==== Hypertension ====
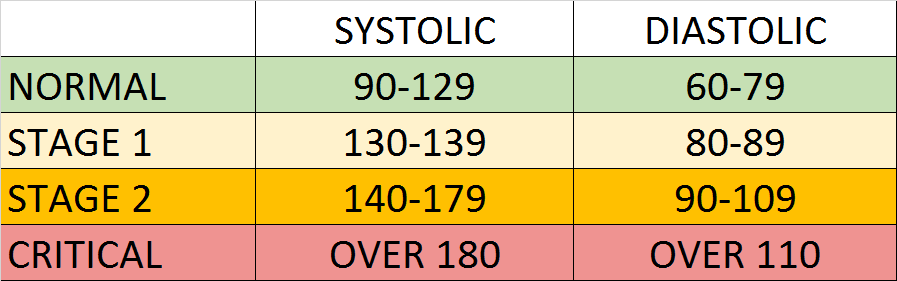
The clinical stages of hypertension

Hypertension is a condition characterized by persistently high blood pressure. Two measurements are taken to quantify blood pressure: systolic and diastolic blood pressure. A patient is diagnosed as hypertensive when their systolic blood pressure is greater than 140 mmHg or diastolic blood pressure is greater than 90 mmHg. Not many people with hypertension are aware that they have the condition. In 2010, 31.1% of adults worldwide had hypertension, but only 45.6% of them were aware they had the condition. Hypertension is more apparent in the Hispanic/Latino population, as in 2008 the incidence rate of hypertension for Hispanic adults aged 45–84 was 65.7%, compared to 56.8% for non-Hispanic whites of the same age. Hispanic/Latinos are more likely to be unaware of their condition, compared to non-Hispanics, and be less likely to seek treatment, which increases the risk of developing cardiovascular disease and AD. Hypertension can be reduced by lifestyle changes (e.g., weight loss and exercise) and pharmacological intervention. Multiple studies suggest that use of antihypertensive drugs might reduce the risk of dementia and AD.

==== Diabetes ====
Type-II diabetes is a metabolic condition characterized by high blood sugar and defective insulin secretion by pancreatic β-cells. A patient is diagnosed with diabetes when their fasting blood glucose levels are above 7.0 mmol/L (126 mg/dL) or above 11.1 mmol/L (200 mg/dl) two hours after an oral dose of glucose. As with hypertension, diabetes is more common in the Hispanic/Latino population than in the Caucasian population. In the U.S., Hispanic/Latinos are reported to have a diabetes prevalence of 22.6%, compared to 11.3% in non-Hispanic whites. This increased risk is associated with genetic factors, environmental factors (i.e. diet), and socioeconomic status. Recently AD has also been characterized as a metabolic disease of glucose regulation, as patients experience alterations in brain insulin responsiveness that leads to oxidative stress and inflammation. Changes in cerebral glucose signaling associated with AD have been proposed to as type three diabetes, although this has not been adopted as an official designation. Older diabetic Mexican Americans are twice as likely to develop dementia than those without diabetes. Additionally, the longer a patient is diabetic, the faster the rate of cognitive decline within the same and racial and age group.

==== Lifestyle ====
Alzheimer's can change your life rapidly and it involves stripping away a lot of an individual's abilities. The neurons that are damaged first are those involving memory, language, and thinking. Individual's living with this disease may develop changes in mood, personality or behavior and eventually neuronal damage extends to parts of the brain that enable basic bodily functions. Many of the comorbidities for AD can be reduced through lifestyle changes. Hypertension can be treated by reducing sodium intake, increasing potassium intake, reducing alcohol consumption, and engaging in at least 150 min of moderate-intensity or 75 min of vigorous-intensity physical activity per week. Similarly, diabetes can also be treated by increasing physical activity and changing diet. The same lifestyle changes are recommended for AD patients.

== Hispanics and Latinos in clinical research ==
The distribution of Hispanics and Latinos in the United States

The terms Latino and Hispanic are used interchangeably in formal and informal settings. The term "Hispanic" specifically denotes those who can trace their ancestry to a Spanish-speaking country, such as Spain and most of Latin America, the exceptions being Brazil, Guyana, Suriname, and French Guiana. The term "Latino" denotes those who can trace their ancestry to Latin America and the Caribbean. The diversity among Hispanic and Latino groups has led to proposals that the Latino/Hispanic population in the U.S. should not be treated as a homogenous group, and also to define subgroups based on their country of origin. The Latino/Hispanic community has recently been open to wanting to learn more about Alzheimer's Disease but because of they limited resources they aren't able to participate in clinical research.

=== Socioeconomic status ===
The socioeconomic status of the Hispanic/Latino population is thought to contribute to their low participation in clinical trials. In the U.S., the income and socioeconomic status of Hispanics and Latinos are lower when compared to White Non-Hispanics. In 2015, a study reported that 25% of the Hispanic/Latino population lives in poverty and their median family income was $17,800 lower than their white counterparts. The Hispanic/Latino community have grown the understand the affect Alzheimer has had on their community. A need for care was found to have been associated with education level and be a leading contributor to disability among older people. This shows significant implications for the economy and overall burden caregivers have to take on.

Studies from 2017 showed that the difference in income is present across many income brackets, with only 38.6% of Latinos reporting a household income between $50,000 and $149,999, in comparison to 45.6% of Non-Hispanic whites. A similar trend was seen with levels of higher education and medical literacy attained by Hispanics and Latinos. As of 2013, it was reported that 22% of Latino adults (25 years and over) had earned an associate degree or higher, compared to the 46% seen in White Non-Hispanics. This trend is also seen with advanced degrees, as Latinos only account for 7% of Master's degrees and 1% Doctorate degrees awarded in the U.S. The lower measures of socioeconomic achievement and education level have been proposed to be associated with high mortality and dementia rates. In contrast, high educational levels are correlated with lower rates of dementia.

Hispanic and Latinos that are 65 years and older make up one of the largest groups of uninsured individuals in the U.S. This makes it difficult for these seniors to obtain the clinical care necessary for management of AD. The cost of care for insured patients 65 years and older was estimated to be $25,213 per person, compared to the estimated $7750 for senior patients without AD. Increasing efforts are being made to include minorities in clinical research, for instance by providing travel support for participants.

The Cost of AD Care in 2020
| Payment Source | Cost in Billions ($) |
|---|---|
| Medicare | $155 |
| Medicaid | $51 |
| Out of Pocket | $66 |
| Other | $33 |
| TOTAL | $305 |

=== Language barrier ===
Putative language barriers can also interfere with healthcare for the Hispanic and Latino community. Clinical trials can require participants to be fluent in English, which can potentially exclude older Hispanic and Latino subjects, who might not be fluent in English. Only 40% of the older generation, Latinos over the age of 69, are fluent. Proficiency in English is less of an issue for younger Latinos, with 90% of the population between the ages of 5 and 17 speaking the language fluently. Weak communication between physician and patient can also impair medical care. For instance, this issue occurs with clinical notes, which are typically translated from the English version of the same document for Spanish-speaking individuals. The medical community is attempting to address this issue by recruiting staff and physicians able to communicate with participants in their native language, as well as providing training on cultural sensitivity.

== See also ==
- Race and health in the United States
