= SLRP =

SLRP may refer to:

- Soluble low density lipoprotein receptor-related protein
- Small leucine-rich repeat protein
- Small leucine-rich repeat proteoglycan
