= Cenani–Lenz syndactylism =

- Other names: Syndactyly type 7
- Specialty: Medical genetics
- Frequency: 0.0001%

Cenani–Lenz syndactylism, also known as Cenani–Lenz syndrome or Cenani–syndactylism, is an autosomal recessive congenital malformation syndrome involving both upper and lower extremities.

== Presentation ==
It is characterized by a nearly symmetrical presence of a spoon hand (classical type) or, more frequently, an oligodactylous hand. Individuals with this syndrome present the following symptoms: carpal, metacarpal and digital synostoses, disorganization of carpal bones, numeric reduction of digital rays and toe syndactyly. Additionally, other symptoms may include radioulnar synostosis, brachymesomelia, radius head dislocation, metatarsal synostoses and numeric reduction of rays.

== Cause ==
Cenani–Lenz syndactylism is inherited in an autosomal recessive manner. This means the defective gene responsible for the disorder is located on an autosome, and two copies of the defective gene (one inherited from each parent) are required in order to be born with the disorder. The parents of an individual with an autosomal recessive disorder both carry one copy of the defective gene, but usually do not experience any signs or symptoms of the disorder.

In a test of the theory that the locus associated with the disorder was at 15q13-q14, FMN1 and GREM1 were eliminated as candidates. It is associated with LRP4.

== Eponym ==
The syndrome is named after Turkish (Asim Cenani) and German (Widukind Lenz) medical geneticists.
