= Alzheimer's disease in African Americans =

Alzheimer's disease in African Americans is becoming a rising topic of interest in care, support, and scientific research, as Alzheimer's disease (AD) affects African Americans disproportionately. Research on AD has shown that there are clear disparities in the disease among racial groups, with higher prevalence and incidence in African Americans than the overall average. Pathologies for Alzheimer's also seem to manifest differently in African Americans, including with neuroinflammation markers, cognitive decline, and biomarkers. Although there are genetic risk factors for Alzheimer's, these account for few cases in all racial groups.

There are also socioeconomic disparities—such as education, representation in clinical trials, and cost of care services—between African Americans and other racial groups that are important for the care and research of AD in African Americans.

== Alzheimer's disease ==
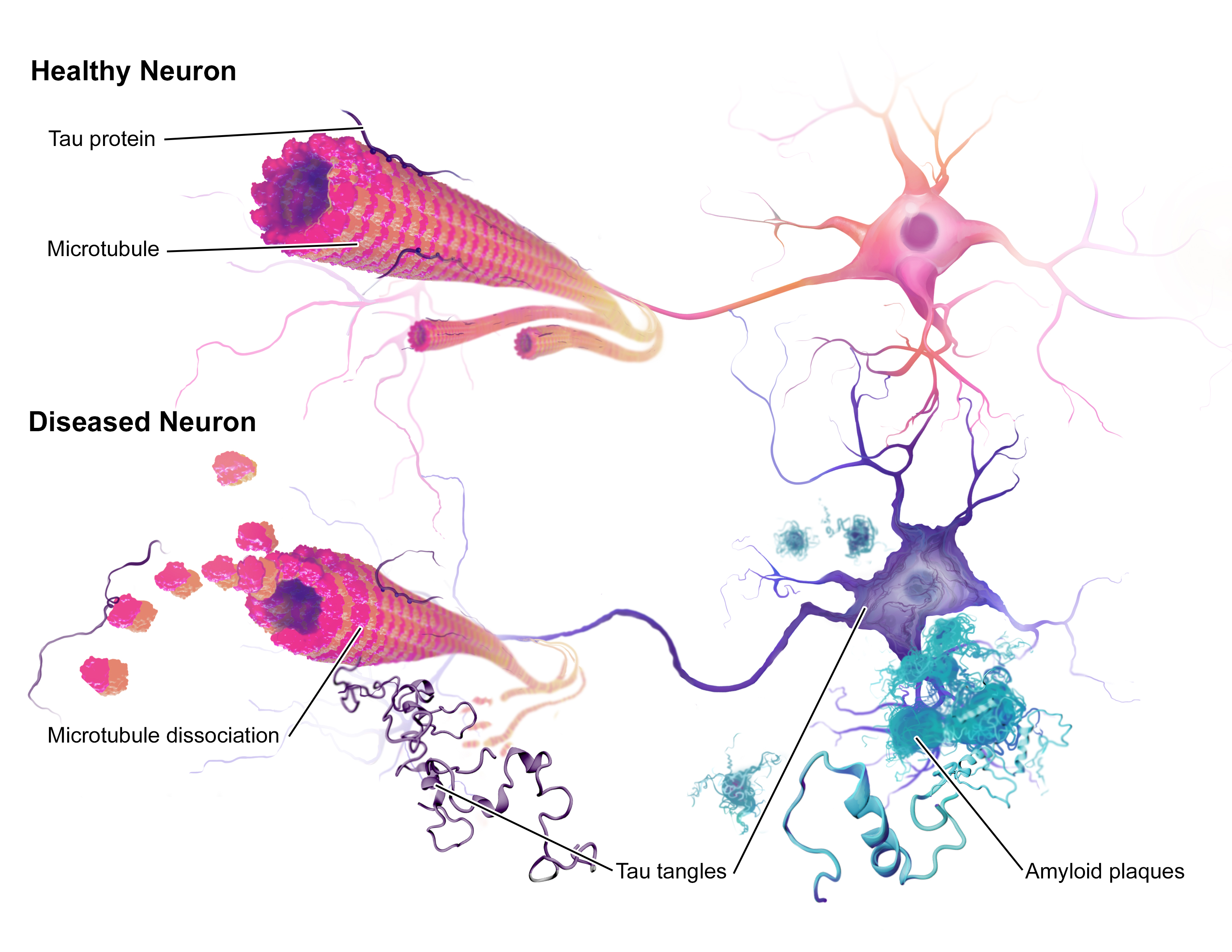
Neuropathologies of Alzheimer's disease, including intracellular neurofibrillary tangles and extracellular amyloid beta plaques.

Alzheimer's disease (AD) is a progressive, irreversible neurodegenerative disease and it is the leading cause of dementia. According to the National Institute on Aging (NIA), AD is characterized by the intracellular aggregation of Neurofibrillary tangle (NFT), which consists of hyper-phosphorylated Tau protein, and by extracellular accumulation of amyloid beta. Symptoms of AD include memory loss, cognitive decline, increased anxiety or aggression. The disease can be fatal.

=== Prevalence and incidence ===
Proportion of African Americans in each U.S. state, the District of Columbia, and Puerto Rico according to the 2020 United States Census.

In 2020, approximately 5.8 million Americans over the age of 65 (or approximately 1 in 10 people in that age group) had AD. Risk for the disease increases with age, with 32% of people over the age of 85 living with AD. The number of AD patients will increase rapidly in the coming years, as the majority of the Baby Boomer generation has reached the age of 65 and the population of Americans over the age of 65 is projected to grow to 88 million by 2050.

African Americans are about twice as likely to have AD as Caucasians, and the prevalence of AD in African Americans is higher than that in any other racial group. 21.3% of African Americans over the age of 70 have AD, a much higher prevalence than the national average. The risk of dementia (not limited to AD) among relatives of African Americans who have AD is 43.7%, suggesting a strong role of environmental factors in disease onset. The incidence of AD in African Americans is also the highest out of all racial groups. The age-adjusted incidence rate per 1,000 people per year is 26.6 for African Americans, compared to the overall average of 21.7.

=== Neuroinflammation ===
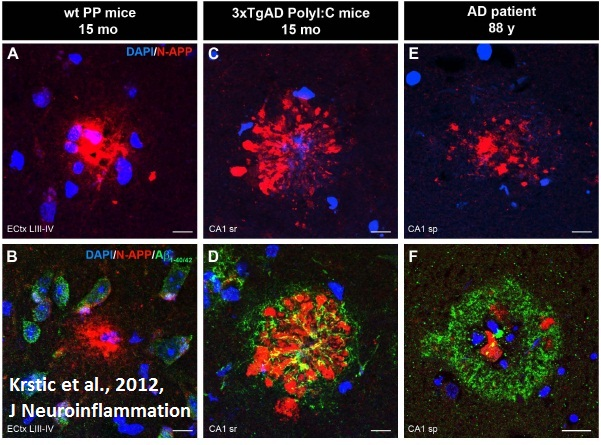
Inflammation-induced plaques in wild-type and AD-transgenic mice (3xTgAD). Inflammation-induced accumulation of APP fragments (shown in red) represents the seeding point for the aggregation of amyloid beta peptides (shown in green).

Neuroinflammation has been suggested to play a prominent role in the pathogenesis of AD due to the discovery of increased levels of inflammatory markers in AD patients; There is an increased level of inflammation markers, such as IL-1β, MIG, TRAIL, and FADD, in the brains of African Americans compared to Caucasians. Furthermore, the NLPR3 inflammasome that is thought to be critically involved in AD has increased activation in African Americans. Evidence also suggests a stronger association between the level of IL-8 (an inflammation marker) and cognitive performance in African Americans than Caucasians.

=== Cognitive decline and mild cognitive impairment ===
The incidence of Mild cognitive impairment (MCI), an indicator of disease onset in early stages, is higher in African American populations compared to White populations. However, risk factors of AD, such as diabetes and cardiovascular diseases, are not associated with an increased risk of MCI in African Americans. The rate of cognitive decline in MCI also appears to be faster in African Americans. But the majority of African American patients with MCI are considered nonamnestic, particularly in language and executive function, so diagnosis of MCI among African Americans could lead to early interventions that delay further cognitive decline.

=== Biomarkers ===
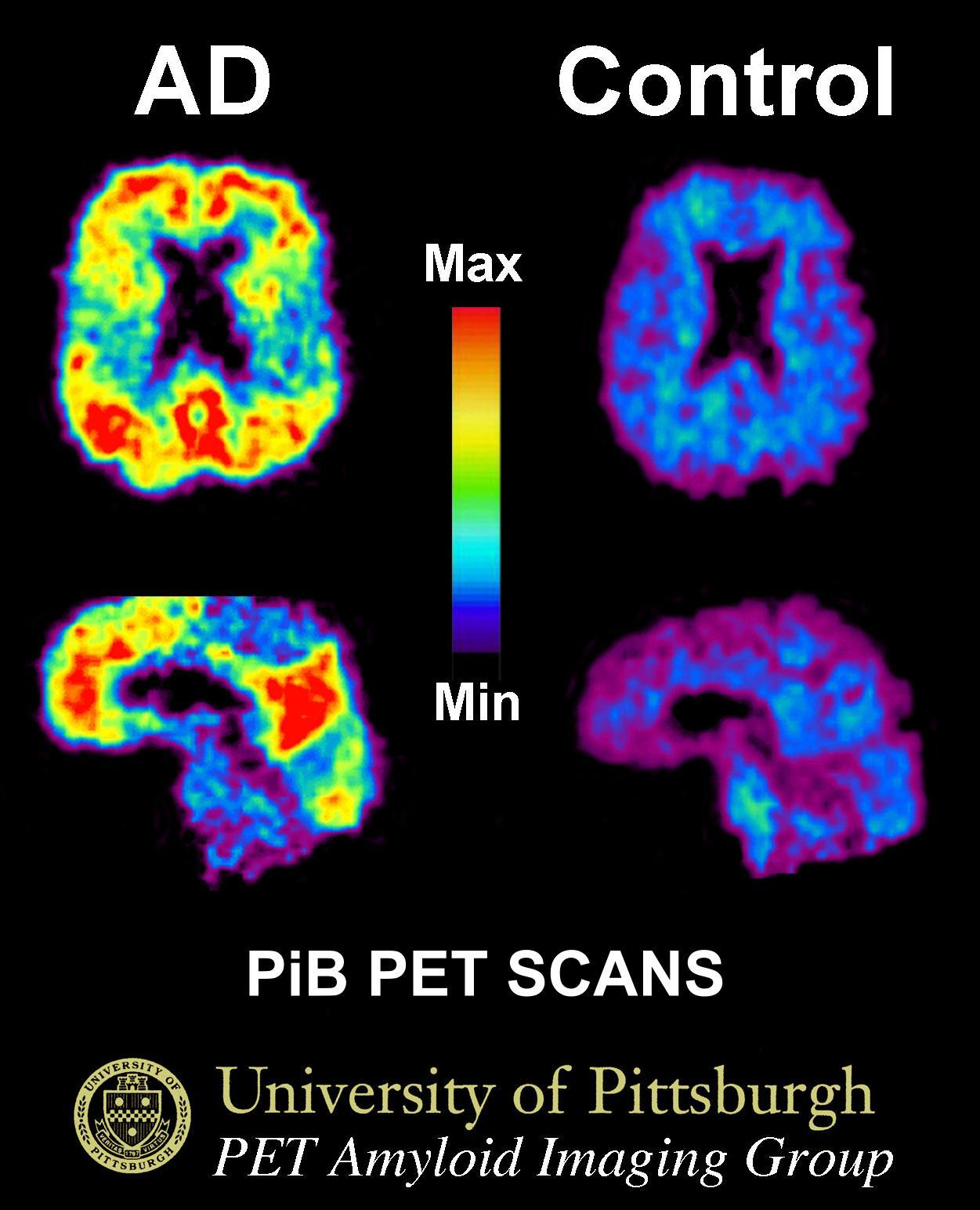
PiB-PET scan of an AD patient (left) and a healthy elderly individual (right). Pittsburg Compound B (PiB) is a tracer for amyloid PET. Areas of red and yellow correspond to high concentration of PiB, suggesting high amounts of amyloid deposits.

A biomarker is a measurable indicator of a disease's state and the status of the body. It is helpful in disease diagnosis, tracking progression, and monitoring the response to treatment. Developing reliable biomarkers is an important part of AD research because an early, correct clinical diagnosis would allow physicians to initiate treatment with symptomatic and disease-modifying drugs. Biomarkers alone cannot show if a person might have AD, as they are only part of the assessment; however, they can help physicians and researchers identify potential risk factors, detect early brain changes, and track responses to drugs and other non-pharmacological interventions.

==== Brain imaging ====
Amyloid Positron emission tomography (PET) measures the abnormal deposits of amyloid beta. Higher levels of amyloid beta are associated with presence of amyloid plaques, one of the hallmarks of AD. The current data on amyloid PET in African Americans is inconclusive, with results suggesting that amyloid deposition could be higher or lower in African Americans compared to Whites.

Tau PET detects the abnormal accumulation of tau protein, which is also a hallmark of AD. It is not commonly used in medical practice to diagnose patients, but it is still useful in research settings to test potential treatments. A tau imaging study found no racial differences in tau deposition.

==== CSF biomarkers ====
Studies have shown that although cerebrospinal fluid (CSF) levels of amyloid beta 42 (the major component of amyloid plaques) the mostly widely used CSF biomarker for AD are similar in African American and White patients, African American patients with MCI have higher amyloid beta 40 levels than White participants with MCI. Tau CSF studies have found that tau isoforms, total-tau and p-tau181 (a form of phosphorylated tau), are lower in African American patients than White patients, suggesting lower levels of tau pathology or lower amyloid-induced tau pathology. However, CSF tau levels are not found to be associated with comorbidities such as cardiovascular diseases.

=== Risk factors ===
Alzheimer's disease is a complex condition where there isn't a single cause, but some risk factors have been identified. Some are unchangeable, like age and heredity, but some are environmental factors that can be modified to influence disease onset and progression.

==== Genetics ====
There are two categories of genes influencing AD: risk genes, which increase the risk of developing AD but do not guarantee that the disease will develop, and deterministic genes that actually cause AD. Fewer than 1% of AD cases are caused by deterministic genes. Of the genes known to be associated with AD in non-Hispanic White patients, only a small subset of genes, including APOE and ABCA7, were implicated at a nominal significance level or stronger in African American individuals, suggesting that further research on the genetics of African American AD patients is necessary to understand the disease pathologies.

===== APOE ε4 =====
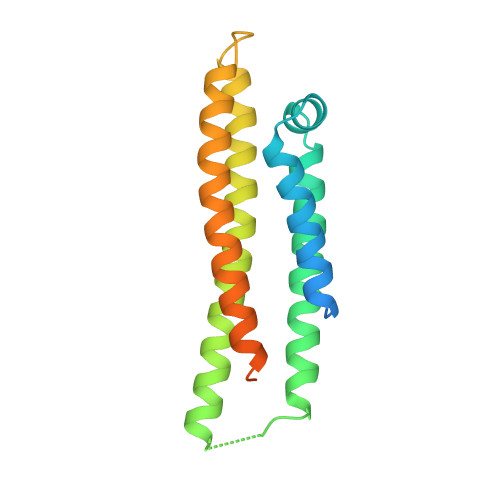
A 22k fragment of APOE4 (PDB 1B68)

The Apolipoprotein E (APOE) is a protein involved in transportation of fats, like cholesterol, in the bloodstream. APOE comes in three different forms, or alleles: ε2, ε3, and ε4. Each person carries two APOE alleles, one from each biological parent, resulting in six possible pairs: ε2/ε2, ε2/ε3, ε2/ε4, ε3/ε3, ε3/ε4, ε4/ε4. Of these, APOE ε4 is associated with increased amyloid beta accumulation and early AD onset. APOE ε4 is the strongest risk gene that has been discovered, as inheriting one or two copies of the ε4 allele increases the risk of developing AD by about three times.

Yet, African Americans with APOE ε4 are at a lower risk of developing AD than other racial groups, even though nearly 40% of African Americans have at least one ε4 allele, compared to only 26% of European Americans. Among individuals with APOE ε4 homozygosity (those that have two ε4 alleles), African Americans have significantly lower odds for developing AD, at an odds ratio (OR) of 2.2–5.7, compared to non-Hispanic Whites (OR: 14.9) and East-Asians (OR: 11.8–33.1). The same is true among individuals with APOE ε4 heterozygosity (according to a study of individuals with APOE ε3/ε4 heterozygosity): African Americans have an OR of 1.1–2.2, much lower than non-Hispanic Whites (OR: 3.2) and East-Asians (OR: 3.1–5.6).

However, for individuals without the APOE ε4 allele, the cumulative risk of AD was four times higher for African Americans than Whites (risk ratio: 4.4).

Table 1: Apolipoprotein E [APOE) Genotype and Allele Distributions in Case Patients With Alzheimer's Disease (AD) and Controls by Ethnic Group
Ethnic group	APOE genotype frequency (%)						APOE allele frequency (%)		
	ε2/ε2	ε2/ε3	ε3/ε3	ε2/ε4	ε3/ε4	ε4/ε4	ε2	ε3	ε4
Caucasians									
AD patients	0.2	4.8	36.4	2.6	41.1	14.8	3.9	59.4	36.7
Controls	0.8	12.7	60.9	2.6	21.3	1.8	8.4	77.9	13.7
African Americans									
AD patients	1.7	9.8	36.2	2.1	37.9	12.3	7.7	59.1	32.2
Controls	0.8	12.9	50.4	2.1	31.8	2.1	8.3	72.7	19.0

Table 2: Odds ratios for developing AD according to APOE genotype and ethnic group
Ethnic group	APOE genotype	
	ε3/ε4	ε4/ε4
Non-Hispanic Whites	3.2	14.9
African Americans	1.1-2.2	2.2-5.7

===== ABCA7 =====
ABCA7 is a member of the highly conserved family of ATP-binding cassette (ABC) transporters, which use energy from ATP hydrolysis to transfer molecules from the inside to the outside of cell membranes. The ABCA7 gene is among the top ten risk genes for AD. Risk from the ABCA7 gene is the strongest for African Americans, whose risk due to the gene has an effect size approaching that of APOE. Furthermore, deleterious ABCA7 alleles can cause protein loss-of-function, and these loss-of-function mutations increase risk of AD by 80% in African Americans.

The mechanism of the role played by ABCA7 in AD pathogenesis remains unknown. A leading hypothesis is that ABCA7 regulates APP processing and amyloid beta clearance.

===== APP =====
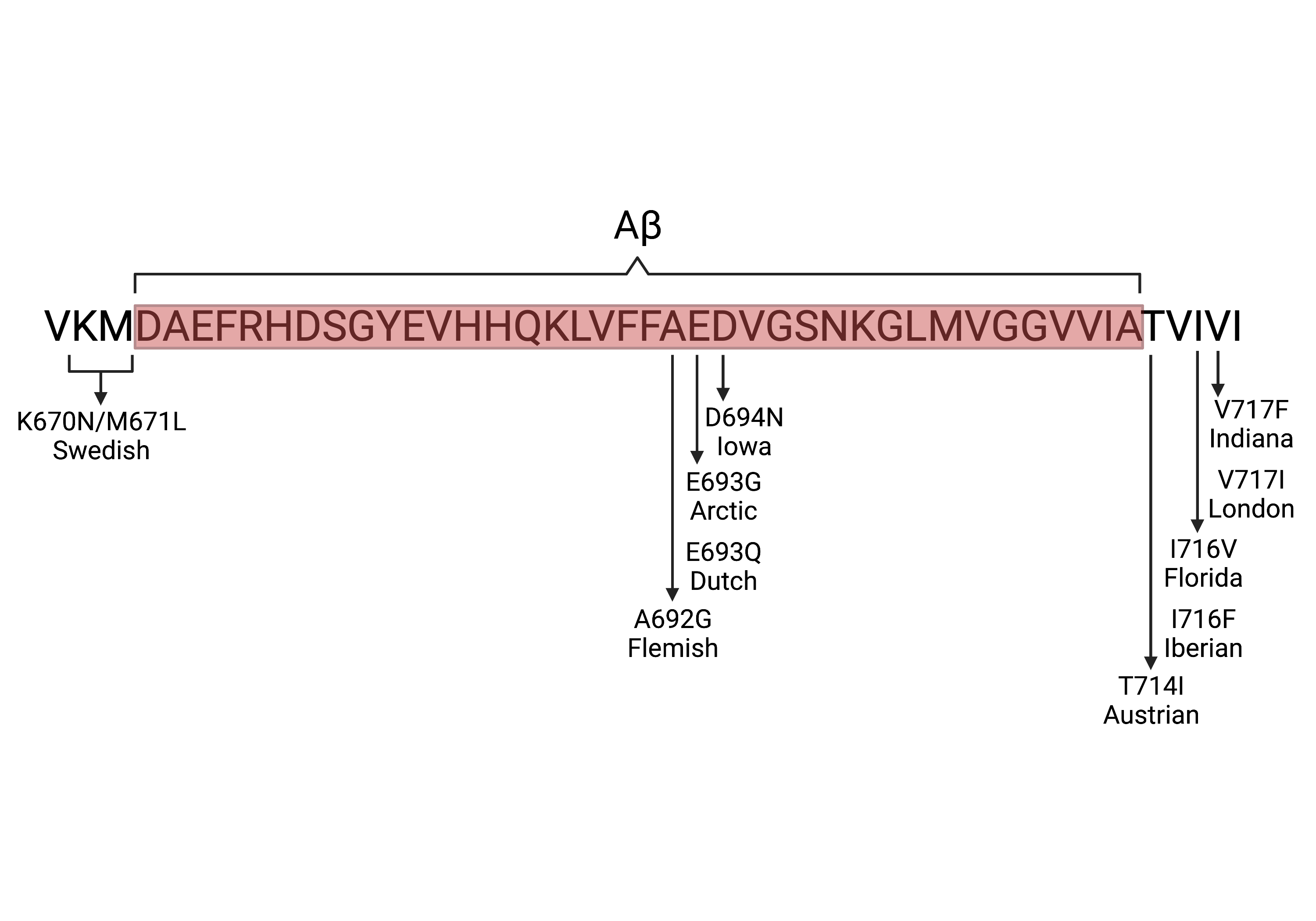
Mutations on the amyloid-beta precursor protein (APP).

The amyloid-beta precursor protein (APP) is a transmembrane protein whose proteolysis produces the amyloid beta peptides. Several rare mutations on APP cause Familial Alzheimer's disease (FAD), a subset of early-onset AD (in which patients develop symptoms by their early 40s), in only a few hundred extended families worldwide. FAD accounts for fewer than 1% of all AD cases.

APP is cleaved first by β-secretase and then γ-secretase to produce amyloid beta peptide. Most of the APP mutations cluster near the β-secretase and γ-secretase cleaving sites. Mutations that cluster near the β-secretase cleaving site generally increase total amyloid beta levels, while mutations that cluster near the γ-secretase cleaving sites generally increase the ratio of amyloid beta 42 to amyloid beta 40. Amyloid beta 42 is the more toxic form of amyloid beta, so an increased ratio of amyloid beta 42 to amyloid beta 40 ratio is a sign of disease progression.

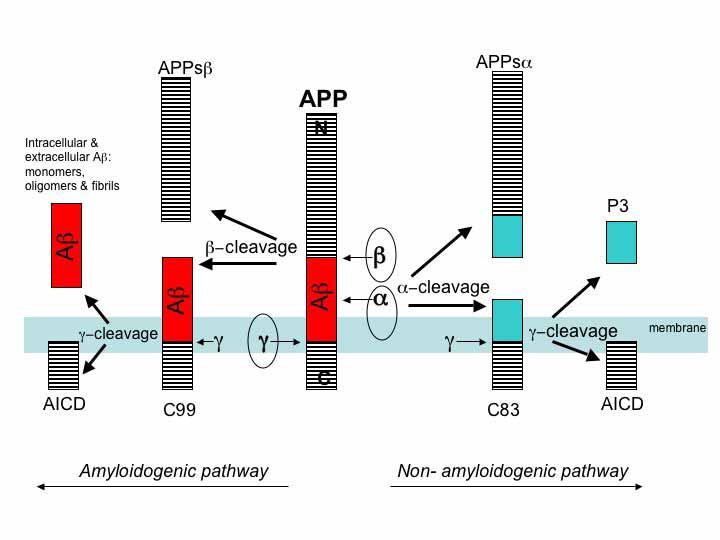
APP proteolysis by β-secretase and γ-secretase.

===== PS-1 and PS-2 =====
Presenilin 1 (PS1) and Presenilin 2 (PS2) are the cleaving enzymes in the γ-secretase complex. There are close to 200 mutations on PS1 and PS2 combined that cause early-onset Alzheimer's disease, and they predominantly alter the amino acids in their transmembrane domains. These mutations increase the production of the less soluble, more toxic Aβ42.

==== Comorbidity ====
A wide variety of comorbid diseases are associated with AD. Cardiovascular diseases, such as stroke, atrial fibrillation, and coronary artery disease, have been seen as closely related to the development of AD at both clinical and pathological levels. In addition, factors (like obesity) that increase risk for cardiovascular diseases are also associated with an increased risk for AD. Rates of severe obesity are higher among African Americans (12.1%) than Hispanics (5.8%) and Whites (5.6%). Cardiovascular diseases and obesity can be managed and countered through exercise, with regular exercise also reducing the risk of developing AD by 45%. Exercise also has a greater positive effect in cognitive function in AD patients who are APOE ε4 carriers compared to non-carriers. Conversely, APOE ε4 carriers with a sedentary lifestyle show a greater amyloid beta deposition compared to non-carriers.

Type 2 diabetes (T2D) patients have a higher risk of developing AD and Vascular dementia. Although the exact cause of this association is unclear, alterations in insulin, glucose, and amyloid metabolism may underlie the association between both diseases. Type 2 diabetes patients also have a 25%-90% increase for cognitive impairment. In 2018, African Americans were twice as likely as non-Hispanic whites to die from diabetes, and African American adults are 60% more likely than non-Hispanic whites to be diagnosed with diabetes by a physician. There is also a greater prevalence of risk factors related to diabetes among African Americans, contributing to the higher burden of diabetes and higher risk of AD.

=== Treatments ===
There is currently no cure for AD, but there are drugs approved by the Food and Drug Administration (FDA) to manage disease progression. Treatments can be divided into either symptomatic drugs, meaning that they only affect the symptoms and not the underlying cause, or disease-modifying drugs, meaning that they could change the disease progression over time.

Table 3: Major classes of FDA-approved treatments for Alzheimer's Disease
Drug name	Brand name	Drug type	Drug use	Drug class and mechanism of action	Common side effects	Delivery method
Aducanumab	ADUHELM^{®}	Disease-modifying	MCI or mild AD	Monoclonal antibody immunotherapy that removes amyloid-beta to help reduce plaques	Amyloid-related imaging abnormalities (ARIA), which could lead to fluid building up and/or bleeding in the brain. Also headache, dizziness, diarrhea, confusion.	Intravenous injection
Donepezil	ARICEPT^{®}	Symptomatic	Mild, moderate, and severe AD	Cholinesterase inhibitor that prevents the breakdown of acetylcholine	Nausea, vomiting, diarrhea, muscle cramps, fatigue, weight loss.	Tablet
Memantine	NAMENDA^{®}	Symptomatic	Moderate to severe AD	NMDA receptor antagonist that blocks the toxic effects associated with excess glutamate and regulates glutamine activation	Dizziness, headache, diarrhea, constipation, confusion.	Tablet, oral solution, or extended-release capsule

== Socioeconomic disparities ==
=== Education ===
People with greater levels of education generally have a lower risk of developing AD, With each additional year of formal education, the odds of developing AD decrease by 12%. Several factors may contribute to this. For example, continued learning allows the brain to make more flexible and efficient use of cognitive networks, or the networks of neuron-to-neuron connections known as "cognitive reserve." Building cognitive reserve also enables a person to continue carrying out day-to-day and more complex cognitive tasks despite brain damages, such as beta-amyloid and tau accumulation. Additionally, a person with greater levels of education is more likely to recognize signs of AD symptoms when they first appear and consult a physician, resulting in better prevention in disease progression and better quality of life. And fewer African Americans have tertiary education degrees than the national average: the United States Census Bureau indicated that in 2021, approximately 38% of Americans held a bachelor's degree or higher, compared to 28% of African Americans.

The quality of education, in addition to its quantity, could also contribute to difference in risks. In a 2012 study, the Wechsler Test of Adult Reading was used to assess the individuals' intellectual functioning and therefore estimate the quality of education. African Americans scored significantly lower than White Non-Hispanic counterparts (of similar age, sex, and years of formal education) in many different areas such as memory, attention, and language. However, when adjusted for reading level, the previously observed differences were decreased, suggesting that the quality of education needs to be taken into account when assessing cognitive impairment in AD patients.

Table 4: Percentage of educational attainment in the United States in 2018, by ethnicity
	White	Black	Asian and Pacific Islander	Hispanic	Total
High school graduate or more	90.2%	87.9%	90.5%	71.6%	89.8%
College graduate or more	35.2%	25.2%	56.5%	18.3%	35%

=== Clinical trials ===
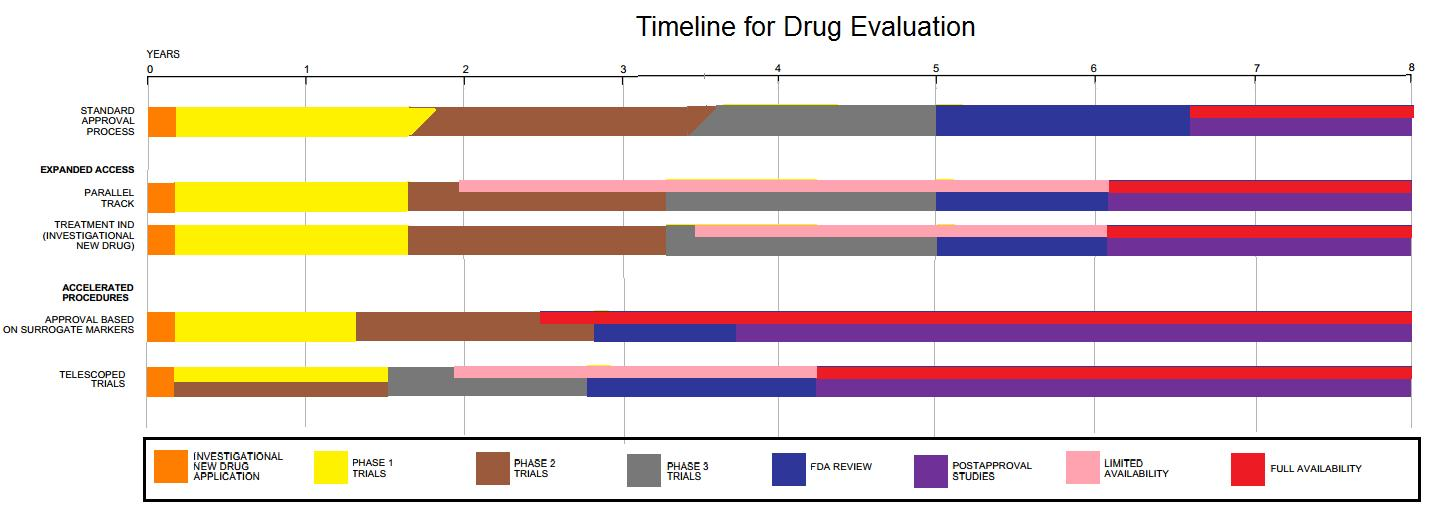
Timeline of various approval tracks and clinical trial phases in the U.S.

For a new drug to be approved by the Food and Drug Administration, it must first go through a clinical trial in both healthy subjects and patients. Clinical trial is important because it can determine if a new treatment is safe and efficacious enough to be distributed to patients.

African Americans are disproportionally underrepresented in clinical trials. Historically, clinical trials primarily used white males as volunteers. In fact, African American patients account for only 5% of clinical trial participants in the United States. This could create gaps in scientists' understanding of disease conditions, risk factors, and treatment options, especially for a disease like AD that impacts African Americans at a higher rate. More African Americans should be included in clinical trials for AD treatment so scientists and physicians could better development treatments and care plans for the African American population.

A long history of discrimination from medical professionals could be the reason why there is a high level of mistrust of clinical trials in African Americans. 62% of African Americans believe that medical research is biased against people of color. Therefore, it is important to improve the diversity and inclusion of clinical trials and encourage African Americans to volunteer for clinical trials.

=== Cost of care services ===
According to 2019 data, among AD and other dementia patients, African Americans had the highest total annual payments per person, at $28,633, while White Non-Hispanics had the lowest payments, at $21,174. This difference is observed in every type of care service: the biggest difference is in hospital care, where the payments are almost $4,000 more per person annually for African Americans compared to White Non-Hispanics ($9,566 vs. $5,683). The difference could be due to more co-morbidities or late-stage diagnosis, which could lead to the worsening of disease. This presents a challenge for the family and physician of African American AD patients, since the median household for African Americans is the lowest among the racial groups at $45,870.

Table 5: Average annual per-person payments by type of service and race/ethnicity for Medicare beneficiaries age 65 and older, with Alzheimer's disease or other dementias, in 2019
Race/Ethnicity	Total Medicare payments per person	Hospital care	Physician care	Skilled nursing facility care	Home health care	Hospice care
White	$21,174	$5,683	$1,637	$3,710	$1,832	$3,382
Black/African American	$28,633	$9,566	$2,219	$4,599	$2,239	$2,503
Hispanic/Latino	$22,694	$7,690	$1,930	$3,535	$1,932	$1,864
Other	$27,548	$8,649	$2,171	$3,703	$3,969	$2,756

== See also ==
- Race and health in the United States
- Clinical trial
- Dementia
- African American health
- Alzheimer's Association
