= Low-density lipoprotein receptor-related protein 4 =

Protein-coding gene in humans

LRP4

Identifiers
- Aliases: LRP4, CLSS, LRP-4, LRP10, MEGF7, SOST2, CMS17, Low density lipoprotein receptor-related protein 4, LDL receptor related protein 4
- External IDs: OMIM: 604270; MGI: 2442252; GeneCards: LRP4

Gene location (Human)
| Chr. | Chromosome 11 (human) |
| Band | 11p11.2 | Start | 46,856,717 bp |
| Band | 11p11.2 | End | 46,918,642 bp |

Gene location (Mouse)
| Chr. | Chromosome 2 (mouse) |
| Band | 2 E1|2 50.63 cM | Start | 91,287,856 bp |
| Band | 2 E1|2 50.63 cM | End | 91,344,124 bp |
RNA expression pattern
| Bgee | Human / Mouse (ortholog); Top expressed in: ventricular zone; dorsal motor nucleus of vagus nerve; internal globus pallidus; putamen; caudate nucleus; skin of leg; skin of abdomen; inferior olivary nucleus; nucleus accumbens; amygdala / Top expressed in: Bowman's capsule; body of femur; ventricular zone; tail of embryo; left lung; spermatogonium; lip; right lung lobe; left lung lobe; skin of external ear; More reference expression data |
| BioGPS | n/a |
Gene ontology
| Molecular function | calcium ion binding; apolipoprotein binding; protein homodimerization activity; scaffold protein binding; receptor tyrosine kinase binding; protein binding; Wnt-protein binding; Wnt-activated receptor activity |
| Cellular component | integral component of membrane; synaptic membrane; postsynaptic density; membrane; neuromuscular junction; cell surface; soma; flotillin complex; dendrite; receptor complex; plasma membrane; plasma membrane raft |
| Biological process | animal organ development; hair follicle development; regulation of protein phosphorylation; protein localization; proximal/distal pattern formation; cell differentiation; protein heterotetramerization; endocytosis; dendrite morphogenesis; kidney development; anatomical structure development; synaptic assembly at neuromuscular junction; regulation of canonical Wnt signaling pathway; negative regulation of Wnt signaling pathway; synapse organization; embryonic digit morphogenesis; Wnt signaling pathway; receptor clustering; BMP signaling pathway; presynaptic membrane assembly; limb development; positive regulation of presynaptic membrane organization; negative regulation of ossification; multicellular organism development; odontogenesis of dentin-containing tooth; positive regulation of skeletal muscle acetylcholine-gated channel clustering; negative regulation of axonogenesis; postsynaptic membrane assembly; embryonic limb morphogenesis; skeletal muscle acetylcholine-gated channel clustering; positive regulation of peptidyl-tyrosine phosphorylation; dorsal/ventral pattern formation; negative regulation of canonical Wnt signaling pathway; Wnt signaling pathway involved in dorsal/ventral axis specification; amyloid-beta clearance by cellular catabolic process |
Sources:Amigo / QuickGO
Orthologs
| Databases | NCBI: entry; OMA: entry |
| Species | Human | Mouse |
| Entrez | 4038 | 228357 |
| Ensembl | ENSG00000134569 | ENSMUSG00000027253 |
| UniProt | O75096 | Q8VI56 |
| RefSeq (mRNA) | NM_002334 | NM_001145857; NM_172668 |
| RefSeq (protein) | NP_002325 | NP_001139329; NP_766256 |
| Location (UCSC) | Chr 11: 46.86 – 46.92 Mb | Chr 2: 91.29 – 91.34 Mb |
| PubMed search |
- Wikidata
| View/Edit Human | View/Edit Mouse |

Low-density lipoprotein receptor-related protein 4 (LRP-4), also known as multiple epidermal growth factor-like domains 7 (MEGF7), is a protein that in humans is encoded by the LRP4 gene. LRP-4 is a member of the Lipoprotein receptor-related protein family and may be a regulator of Wnt signaling.

== Clinical significance ==
Mutations in this gene are associated with Cenani Lenz syndactylism.

Autoantibodies against LRP4 have been connected to and diagnostic for a small fraction (i.e., less than 1%) of myasthenia gravis cases.
