= Apolipoprotein E =

Cholesterol-transporting protein most notably implicated in Alzheimer's disease

APOE
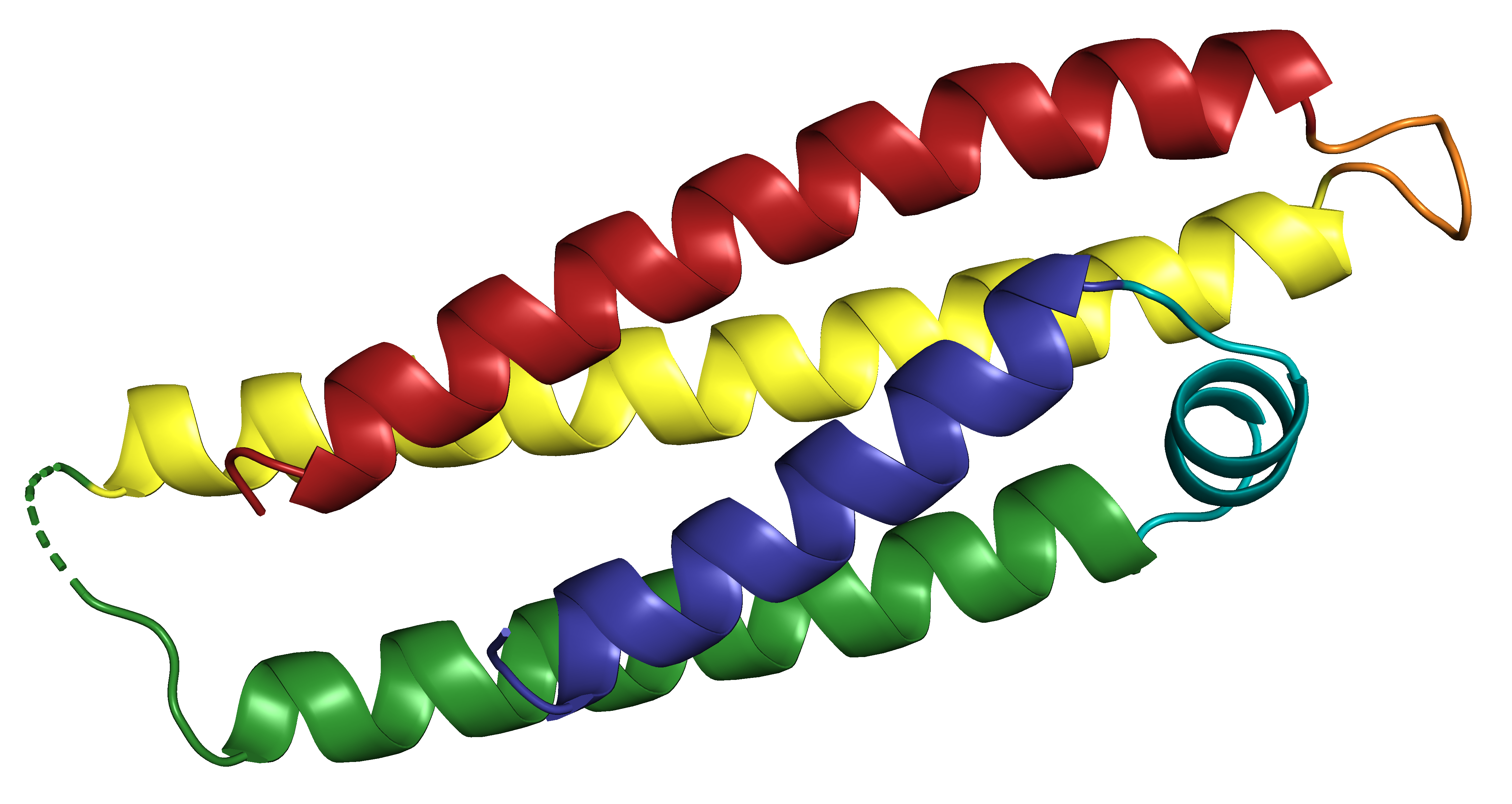

Identifiers
- Aliases: APOE, AD2, APO-E, LDLCQ5, LPG, apolipoprotein E, ApoE4
- External IDs: OMIM: 107741; MGI: 88057; GeneCards: APOE
Available structures
PDB	Ortholog search: PDBe RCSB
PDB	List of PDB id codes 1B68, 1BZ4, 1EA8, 1GS9, 1H7I, 1LE2, 1LE4, 1LPE, 1NFN, 1NFO, 1OEF, 1OEG, 1OR2, 1OR3, 2KC3, 2KNY, 2L7B

Gene location (Human)
Chr.	Chromosome 19 (human)
Band	19q13.32	Start	44,905,791 bp
Band	19q13.32	End	44,909,393 bp

Gene location (Mouse)
Chr.	Chromosome 7 (mouse)
Band	7 A3|7 9.94 cM	Start	19,430,034 bp
Band	7 A3|7 9.94 cM	End	19,433,113 bp
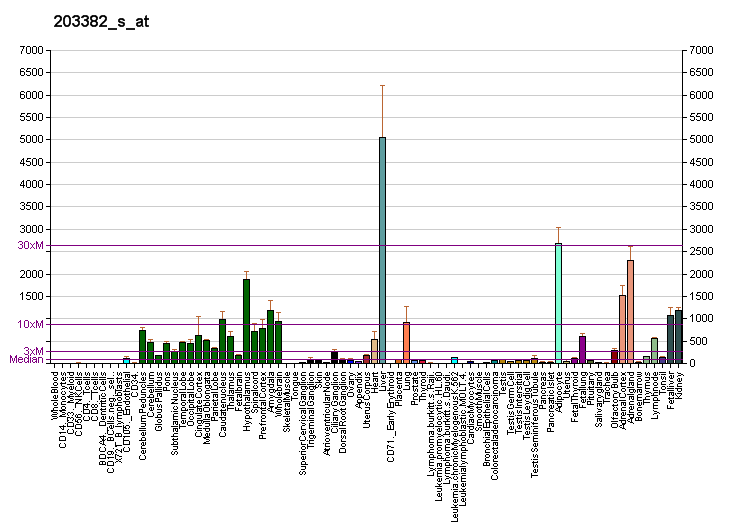
RNA expression pattern
Bgee	Human / Mouse (ortholog); Top expressed in: right adrenal cortex; left adrenal gland; left adrenal cortex; right lobe of liver; nucleus accumbens; amygdala; hypothalamus; caudate nucleus; C1 segment; putamen / Top expressed in: entorhinal cortex; stroma of bone marrow; choroid plexus of fourth ventricle; perirhinal cortex; CA3 field; left lobe of liver; dentate gyrus of hippocampal formation granule cell; yolk sac; gallbladder; superior frontal gyrus; More reference expression data
BioGPS	More reference expression data
Gene ontology
Molecular function	heparin binding; very-low-density lipoprotein particle receptor binding; low-density lipoprotein particle receptor binding; lipoprotein particle binding; phosphatidylcholine-sterol O-acyltransferase activator activity; phospholipid binding; cholesterol transfer activity; protein homodimerization activity; amyloid-beta binding; protein binding; tau protein binding; metal chelating activity; lipid transporter activity; cholesterol binding; antioxidant activity; identical protein binding; lipid binding
Cellular component	cytoplasm; membrane; chylomicron; extracellular region; nucleus; extracellular vesicle; endocytic vesicle lumen; very-low-density lipoprotein particle; extracellular fluid; endoplasmic reticulum; extracellular exosome; Golgi apparatus; blood microparticle; extracellular matrix; plasma membrane; soma; early endosome; low-density lipoprotein particle; dendrite; high-density lipoprotein particle; intermediate-density lipoprotein particle
Biological process	negative regulation of neuron apoptotic process; response to dietary excess; negative regulation of lipid transport across blood-brain barrier; lipid transport; positive regulation of lipid biosynthetic process; regulation of axon extension; positive regulation of postsynaptic membrane organization; positive regulation of cholesterol esterification; phospholipid efflux; cholesterol catabolic process; positive regulation of dendritic spine development; receptor-mediated endocytosis; retinoid metabolic process; positive regulation of amyloid-beta formation; lipid homeostasis; lipoprotein biosynthetic process; cholesterol homeostasis; negative regulation of inflammatory response; triglyceride metabolic process; negative regulation of canonical Wnt signaling pathway; negative regulation of dendritic spine maintenance; negative regulation of blood vessel endothelial cell migration; NMDA glutamate receptor clustering; response to reactive oxygen species; negative regulation of blood coagulation; response to oxidative stress; positive regulation of nitric-oxide synthase activity; negative regulation of phospholipid efflux; positive regulation of cholesterol efflux; negative regulation of MAP kinase activity; artery morphogenesis; very-low-density lipoprotein particle remodeling; regulation of neuronal synaptic plasticity; negative regulation of dendritic spine development; negative regulation of cholesterol biosynthetic process; positive regulation of dendritic spine maintenance; positive regulation of phospholipid efflux; negative regulation of presynaptic membrane organization; negative regulation of neuron death; high-density lipoprotein particle clearance; long-chain fatty acid transport; lipoprotein metabolic process; regulation of tau-protein kinase activity; G protein-coupled receptor signaling pathway; chylomicron remnant clearance; cellular calcium ion homeostasis; cholesterol metabolic process; very-low-density lipoprotein particle clearance; virion assembly; negative regulation of lipid biosynthetic process; cGMP-mediated signaling; triglyceride catabolic process; positive regulation of presynaptic membrane organization; positive regulation of neurofibrillary tangle assembly; AMPA glutamate receptor clustering; positive regulation of low-density lipoprotein particle receptor catabolic process; positive regulation of lipid transport across blood-brain barrier; fatty acid homeostasis; nitric oxide mediated signal transduction; transport; cholesterol efflux; regulation of gene expression; negative regulation of cholesterol efflux; regulation of amyloid-beta clearance; neuron projection regeneration; negative regulation of postsynaptic membrane organization; steroid metabolic process; regulation of Cdc42 protein signal transduction; lipid metabolism; negative regulation of amyloid-beta formation; positive regulation of membrane protein ectodomain proteolysis; vasodilation; intracellular transport; synaptic transmission, cholinergic; positive regulation of neuron death; high-density lipoprotein particle assembly; protein import; high-density lipoprotein particle remodeling; negative regulation of endothelial cell proliferation; maintenance of location in cell; negative regulation of platelet activation; low-density lipoprotein particle remodeling; positive regulation by host of viral process; cytoskeleton organization; regulation of neuron death; reverse cholesterol transport; lipoprotein catabolic process; triglyceride homeostasis; cellular oxidant detoxification; lipid transport involved in lipid storage
Sources:Amigo / QuickGO
Orthologs
Databases	NCBI: entry; OMA: entry
Species	Human	Mouse
Entrez	348	11816
Ensembl	ENSG00000130203	ENSMUSG00000002985
UniProt	P02649	P08226
RefSeq (mRNA)	NM_001302691; NM_000041; NM_001302688; NM_001302689; NM_001302690	NM_009696; NM_001305819; NM_001305843; NM_001305844
RefSeq (protein)	NP_000032; NP_001289617; NP_001289618; NP_001289619; NP_001289620	NP_001292748; NP_001292772; NP_001292773; NP_033826
Location (UCSC)	Chr 19: 44.91 – 44.91 Mb	Chr 7: 19.43 – 19.43 Mb
PubMed search
- Wikidata
View/Edit Human	View/Edit Mouse

Apolipoprotein E (Apo-E) is a protein involved in the transport of fats in the body of mammals. A subtype is implicated in Alzheimer's disease and cardiovascular diseases. It is encoded in humans by the gene APOE.

Apo-E belongs to a family of fat-binding proteins called apolipoproteins. In the circulation, it is present as part of several classes of lipoprotein particles, including chylomicron remnants, VLDL, IDL, and some HDL. Apo-E interacts significantly with the low-density lipoprotein receptor (LDLR), which is essential for the normal endocytosis of triglyceride-rich lipoproteins. In peripheral tissues, Apo-E is primarily produced by the liver and macrophages, and mediates cholesterol transport. In the central nervous system, Apo-E is mainly produced by astrocytes and transports cholesterol to neurons via Apo-E receptors, which are members of the low density lipoprotein receptor gene family. Apo-E is the principal cholesterol carrier in the brain. Apo-E qualifies as a checkpoint inhibitor of the classical complement pathway by complex formation with activated C1q.

== Evolution ==
Apolipoproteins are not unique to mammals. Many terrestrial and marine vertebrates have versions of them. It is believed that APOE arose via gene duplications of APOC1 before the fish–tetrapod split ca. 400 million years ago. Proteins similar in function have been found in choanoflagellates, suggesting that they are a very old class of proteins predating the dawn of all living animals.

The three major human alleles (E4, E3, E2) arose after the primate–human split around 7.5 million years ago. These alleles are the by-product of non-synonymous mutations which led to changes in functionality. The first allele to emerge was E4. After the primate–human split, there were four amino acid changes in the human lineage, three of which had no effect on protein function (V174L, A18T, A135V). The fourth substitution (T61R) traded a threonine for an arginine altering the protein's functionality. This substitution occurred somewhere in the 6 million year gap between the primate–human split and the Denisovan–human split, since exactly the same substitutions were found in Denisovan APOE.

About 220,000 years ago, an arginine to cysteine substitution took place at amino acid 112 (Arg112Cys) of the APOE4 gene, and this resulted in the E3 allele. Finally, 80,000 years ago, an arginine to cysteine substitution at amino acid 158 (Arg158Cys) of the APOE3 gene created the E2 allele.

== Structure ==
=== Gene ===
The gene, APOE, is mapped to chromosome 19 in a cluster with the apolipoprotein C1 (APOC1) gene and the apolipoprotein C2 (APOC2) gene. The APOE gene consists of four exons and three introns, totaling 3597 base pairs. APOE is transcriptionally activated by the liver X receptor (an important regulator of cholesterol, fatty acid, and glucose homeostasis) and peroxisome proliferator-activated receptor γ, nuclear receptors that form heterodimers with retinoid X receptors. In melanocytic cells APOE gene expression may be regulated by MITF.

=== Protein ===
Apoe-E is 299 amino acids long and contains multiple amphipathic α-helices. According to crystallography studies, a hinge region connects the N- and C-terminal regions of the protein. The N-terminal region (residues 1–167) forms an anti-parallel four-helix bundle such that the non-polar sides face inside the protein. Meanwhile, the C-terminal domain (residues 206–299) contains three α-helices which form a large exposed hydrophobic surface and interact with those in the N-terminal helix bundle domain through hydrogen bonds and salt-bridges. The C-terminal region also contains a low density lipoprotein receptor (LDLR)-binding site.

=== Polymorphisms ===
SNP: rs429358
- Gene: ApoE
- Chromosome: 19

External databases
- Ensembl: Human SNPView
- dbSNP: 429358
- HapMap: 429358
- SNPedia: 429358

APOE is polymorphic, with three major alleles (epsilon 2, epsilon 3, and epsilon 4): APOE-ε2 (cys112, cys158), APOE-ε3 (cys112, arg158), and APOE-ε4 (arg112, arg158). Although these allelic forms differ from each other by only one or two amino acids at positions 112 and 158, these differences alter APOE structure and function.

There are several low-frequency polymorphisms of APOE. APOE5 comes in two subtypes E5f and E5s, based on migration rates. APOE5 E5f and APOE7 combined were found in 2.8% of Japanese males. APOE7 is a mutation of APOE3 with two lysine residues replacing glutamic acid residues at positions 244 and 245.

Polymorphism	Worldwide allele frequency	Disease relevance
ε2 (rs7412-T, rs429358-T)	8.4%	This variant of the apoprotein binds poorly to cell surface receptors while ε3 and ε4 bind well. ε2 is associated with both increased and decreased risk for atherosclerosis. Individuals with an ε2/ε2 combination may clear dietary fat slowly and be at greater risk for early vascular disease and the genetic disorder type III hyperlipoproteinemia—94.4% of people with such disease are ε2/ε2. ε2 has also been implicated in Parkinson's disease, but this finding was not replicated in a larger population association study.
ε3 (rs7412-C, rs429358-T)	77.9%	This variant is considered the "neutral" APOE genotype.
ε4 (rs7412-C, rs429358-C)	13.7%	ε4 has been implicated in seizures, sepsis, myocardial infarction, vascular dementia, Herpes simplex virus 1, hypertension, atherosclerosis, Alzheimer's disease, impaired cognitive function, reduced hippocampal volume, HIV, accelerated disease progression in multiple sclerosis, unfavorable outcomes post-traumatic brain injury, ischemic cerebrovascular disease, sleep apnea, both the extension and shortening of telomeres, and reduced neurite outgrowth. However, ε4 has also been associated with decreased risk for multiple cancers, decreased risk for Macular degeneration, decreased risk for glaucoma, enhanced vitamin D and calcium status, higher fecundity, protection against early childhood infections and malnutrition, and decreased fetal, perinatal, and infant mortality.

Much remains to be learned about the APOE isoforms, including the interaction of other protective genes. so caution is advised before making determinant statements about the influence of APOE polymorphisms on cognition, development of Alzheimer's disease, cardiovascular disease, telomere shortening, etc. Many of the studies cited that purport these adverse outcomes are from single studies that have not been replicated and the research is based on unchecked assumptions about this isoform. As of 2007, there was no evidence that APOE polymorphisms influence cognition in younger age groups (other than possible better visual working memory in younger APOE4 age groups), nor that the APOE4 isoform places individuals at increased risk for any infectious disease.

However, the association between the APOE4 allele and Alzheimer's disease has been shown to be weaker in minority groups differently compared to their Caucasian counterparts. Hispanics/Latinos and African Americans who were homozygous for the APOE4 allele had 2.2 and 5.7 times the odds, respectively of developing Alzheimer's disease. The homozygous APOE4 allele has an even stronger effect in East Asian populations, with Japanese populations have 33 times the odds compared to the heterozygous population. Caucasians who were homozygous for the allele had 12.5 times the odds.

== Function ==
As a component of the lipoprotein lipid transport system, APOE facilitates the transport of lipids, fat-soluble vitamins, and cholesterol via the blood. It interacts with the LDL receptor to facilitate endocytosis of VLDL remnants. It is synthesized principally in the liver, but has also been found in other tissues such as the brain, kidneys, and spleen. APOE synthesized in the liver associates with HDL which can then distribute it to newly formed VLDL or chylomicron particles to facilitate their eventual uptake by the liver.

In the nervous system, non-neuronal cell types, most notably astroglia and microglia, are the primary producers of APOE, while neurons preferentially express the receptors for APOE. There are seven currently identified mammalian receptors for APOE which belong to the evolutionarily conserved LDLR family.

APOE was initially recognized for its importance in lipoprotein metabolism and cardiovascular disease. Defects in APOE result in familial dysbetalipoproteinemia aka type III hyperlipoproteinemia (HLP III), in which increased plasma cholesterol and triglycerides are the consequence of impaired clearance of chylomicron, VLDL and LDL. More recently, it has been studied for its role in several biological processes not directly related to lipoprotein transport, including Alzheimer's disease (AD), immunoregulation, and cognition. Though the exact mechanisms remain to be elucidated, isoform 4 of APOE, encoded by an APOE allele, has been associated with increased calcium ion levels and apoptosis following mechanical injury.

In the field of immune regulation, a growing number of studies point to APOE's interaction with many immunological processes, including suppressing T cell proliferation, macrophage functioning regulation, lipid antigen presentation facilitation (by CD1) to natural killer T cell as well as modulation of inflammation and oxidation. APOE is produced by macrophages and APOE secretion has been shown to be restricted to classical monocytes in PBMC, and the secretion of APOE by monocytes is down regulated by inflammatory cytokines and upregulated by TGF-beta.

== Clinical significance ==
=== Alzheimer's disease ===
As of 2012, the E4 variant was the largest known genetic risk factor for late-onset sporadic Alzheimer's disease (AD) in a variety of ethnic groups. However, the E4 variant does not correlate with risk in every population. Nigerian people have the highest observed frequency of the APOE4 allele in world populations, but AD is rare among them. This may be due to their low cholesterol levels. Caucasian and Japanese carriers of two E4 alleles have between 10 and 30 times the risk of developing AD by 75 years of age, as compared to those not carrying any E4 alleles. This may be caused by an interaction with amyloid. There is a sex specific effect, as presence of APOE4 increases AD risk more in women than in men. Alzheimer's disease is characterized by build-ups of aggregates of the peptide beta-amyloid, the breakdown of which Apolipoprotein E enhances, both within and between cells. The isoform APOE-ε4 is not as effective as the others at promoting this breakdown, resulting in increased vulnerability to AD in individuals with that gene variation.

The amyloid hypothesis of Alzheimer's disease has been questioned, and a 2021 article in Science claimed that "Just as removing smoke does not extinguish a fire, reducing amyloid plaques may not affect the course of Alzheimer's disease." The role that the E4 variant carries can still be fully explained even in the absence of a valid amyloid hypothesis given the fact that reelin signaling emerges to be one of the key processes involved in Alzheimer's disease and the E4 variant is shown to interact with ApoER2, one of the neuronal reelin receptors, thereby obstructing reelin signaling.

Although 40–65% of AD patients have at least one copy of the ε4 allele, at least one-third of patients with AD are APOE4 negative and some APOE4 homozygotes never develop the disease. Yet those with two ε4 alleles have up to 20 times the risk of developing AD. There is also evidence that the APOE2 allele may serve a protective role in AD. Thus, the genotype most at risk for Alzheimer's disease and at an earlier age is APOE4,4. Using genotype APOE3,3 as a benchmark (with the persons who have this genotype regarded as having a risk level of 1.0) and for white populations only, individuals with genotype APOE4,4 have an odds ratio of 14.9 of developing Alzheimer's disease. Individuals with the APOE3,4 genotype face an odds ratio of 3.2, and people with a copy of the 2 allele and the 4 allele (APOE2,4), have an odds ratio of 2.6. Persons with one copy each of the 2 allele and the 3 allele (APOE2,3) have an odds ratio of 0.6. Persons with two copies of the 2 allele (APOE2,2) also have an odds ratio of 0.6.

Estimated worldwide human allele frequencies of APOE in Caucasian population
Allele	ε2	ε3	ε4
General frequency	8.4%	77.9%	13.7%
AD frequency	3.9%	59.4%	36.7%

While ApoE4 has been found to greatly increase the odds that an individual will develop Alzheimer's, a 2002 study concluded, that in persons with any combination of APOE alleles, high serum total cholesterol and high blood pressure in mid-life are independent risk factors which together can nearly triple the risk that the individual will later develop AD. Projecting from their data, some researchers have suggested that lowering serum cholesterol levels may reduce a person's risk for Alzheimer's disease, even if they have two ApoE4 alleles, thus reducing the risk from nine or ten times the odds of getting AD down to just two times the odds.

Women are more likely to develop AD than men across most ages and APOE genotypes. Premorbid women with the ε4 allele have significantly more neurological dysfunction than men.

APOE-ε4 increases the risk not only for AD but also for dementia in pure alpha-synucleinopathies. The influence of APOE-ε4 on hippocampal atrophy was suggested to be more predominant early in the course of AD at milder stages prior to more widespread neurodegeneration.

With the approval of the first disease-modifying therapies for Alzheimer's disease based on monoclonal antibodies against amyloid-beta, which delay disease progression, APOE genotyping has also become important in assessing a patient's risk of the side effect of amyloid-related imaging abnormalities (ARIA) under therapy. The medicinal product lecanemab (Leqembi), intended for the treatment of early Alzheimer's disease in apolipoprotein E ε4 (ApoE ε4) non-carriers or heterozygotes, has been approved for use in the European Union, United States, and other countries.
