= YWTD repeat =

LDL receptor repeat class B

Identifiers
- Symbol: Ldl_recept_b
- Pfam: PF00058
- InterPro: IPR000033
Available protein structures:
- PDB: IPR000033 PF00058 (ECOD; PDBsum)
- AlphaFold: IPR000033; PF00058

YWTD repeats are four-stranded beta-propeller repeats found in low-density lipoprotein receptors (LDLR). The six YWTD repeats together fold into a six-bladed beta-propeller (InterPro: IPR011042). Each blade of the propeller consists of four antiparallel beta-strands; the innermost strand of each blade is labeled 1 and the outermost strand, 4. The sequence repeats are offset with respect to the blades of the propeller, such that any given 40-residue YWTD repeat spans strands 24 of one propeller blade and strand 1 of the subsequent blade. This offset ensures circularization of the propeller because the last strand of the final sequence repeat acts as an innermost strand 1 of the blade that harbors strands 24 from the first sequence repeat. The repeat is found in a variety of proteins that include, vitellogenin receptor from Drosophila melanogaster, low-density lipoprotein (LDL) receptor, preproepidermal growth factor, and nidogen (entactin).

The LDLR regulates cholesterol homeostasis in mammalian cells. LDLR binds cholesterol-carrying LDL, associates with clathrin-coated pits, and is internalized into acidic endosomes where it separates from its ligand. The ligand is degraded in lysosomes, while the receptor returns to the cell surface. The LDLR has several domains. The ligand-binding domain contains seven LDL receptor class A repeats, each with three disulphide bonds and a coordinated Ca^{2+} ion. The second conserved region contains two EGF repeats, followed by six YWTD or LDL receptor class B repeats and another EGF repeat. This conserved region is critical for ligand release and recycling of the receptor.
