= LRP1B =

Protein-coding gene in the species Homo sapiens

Identifiers
- Aliases: LRP1B, LRP-DIT, LRPDIT, LDL receptor related protein 1B, LRP-1B
- External IDs: OMIM: 608766; MGI: 2151136; GeneCards: LRP1B

Gene location (Human)
Chr.	Chromosome 2 (human)
Band	2q22.1-q22.2	Start	140,231,423 bp
Band	2q22.1-q22.2	End	142,131,016 bp

Gene location (Mouse)
Chr.	Chromosome 2 (mouse)
Band	2|2 B	Start	40,485,258 bp
Band	2|2 B	End	42,543,636 bp
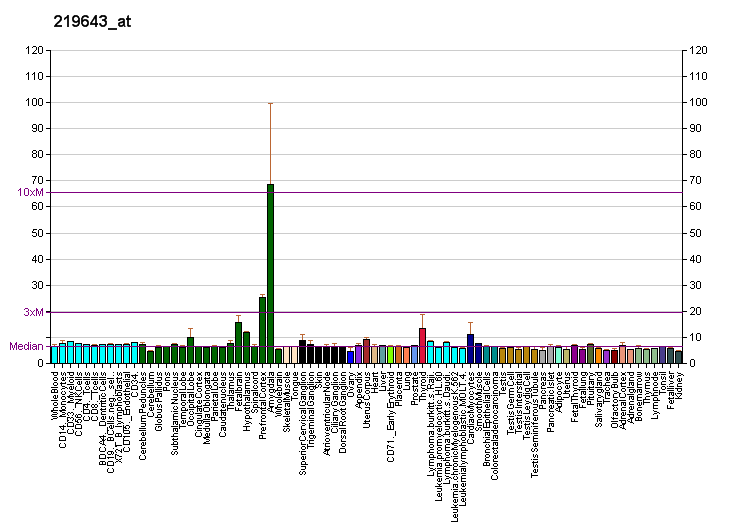
RNA expression pattern
Bgee	Human / Mouse (ortholog); Top expressed in: endothelial cell; Brodmann area 23; Region I of hippocampus proper; Skeletal muscle tissue of rectus abdominis; glutes; testicle; prefrontal cortex; primary visual cortex; anterior cingulate cortex; amygdala / Top expressed in: zygote; facial motor nucleus; dentate gyrus; dentate gyrus of hippocampal formation granule cell; lumbar subsegment of spinal cord; dorsal striatum; superior frontal gyrus; primary visual cortex; ventromedial nucleus; globus pallidus; More reference expression data
BioGPS	More reference expression data
Gene ontology
Molecular function	calcium ion binding
Cellular component	integral component of membrane; receptor complex; membrane
Biological process	protein transport; endocytosis; receptor-mediated endocytosis
Sources:Amigo / QuickGO
Orthologs
Databases	NCBI: entry; OMA: entry
Species	Human	Mouse
Entrez	53353	94217
Ensembl	ENSG00000168702	ENSMUSG00000049252
UniProt	Q9NZR2	Q9JI18
RefSeq (mRNA)	NM_018557	NM_053011
RefSeq (protein)	NP_061027	n/a
Location (UCSC)	Chr 2: 140.23 – 142.13 Mb	Chr 2: 40.49 – 42.54 Mb
PubMed search
- Wikidata
View/Edit Human	View/Edit Mouse

Low-density lipoprotein receptor-related protein 1B is a protein that in humans is encoded by the LRP1B gene.

== Function ==
LRP1B belongs to the LDL receptor gene family. These receptors play a wide variety of roles in normal cell function and development due to their interactions with multiple ligands.
