= LRP10 =

Protein-coding gene in the species Homo sapiens

Identifiers
- Aliases: LRP10, LRP9, MST087, MSTP087, LDL receptor related protein 10, LRP-10
- External IDs: OMIM: 609921; MGI: 1929480; GeneCards: LRP10

Gene location (Human)
| Chr. | Chromosome 14 (human) |
| Band | 14q11.2 | Start | 22,871,740 bp |
| Band | 14q11.2 | End | 22,881,713 bp |

Gene location (Mouse)
| Chr. | Chromosome 14 (mouse) |
| Band | 14|14 C2 | Start | 54,701,594 bp |
| Band | 14|14 C2 | End | 54,708,954 bp |
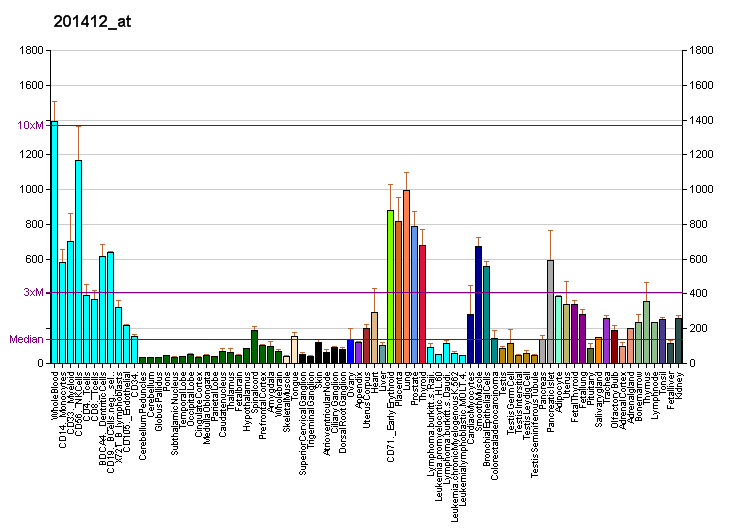
RNA expression pattern
| Bgee | Human / Mouse (ortholog); Top expressed in: stromal cell of endometrium; decidua; right coronary artery; pancreatic ductal cell; gastric mucosa; popliteal artery; tibial arteries; gallbladder; Descending thoracic aorta; ascending aorta / Top expressed in: choroid plexus of fourth ventricle; mesenteric lymph nodes; molar; decidua; pyloric antrum; superior surface of tongue; crypt of lieberkuhn of small intestine; large intestine; parotid gland; colon; More reference expression data |
| BioGPS | More reference expression data |
Gene ontology
| Molecular function | low-density lipoprotein particle receptor activity |
| Cellular component | integral component of membrane; clathrin-coated pit; membrane |
| Biological process | inner ear development; lipid transport; endocytosis; receptor-mediated endocytosis; lipid metabolism |
Sources:Amigo / QuickGO
Orthologs
| Databases | NCBI: entry; OMA: entry |
| Species | Human | Mouse |
| Entrez | 26020 | 65107 |
| Ensembl | ENSG00000197324 | ENSMUSG00000022175 |
| UniProt | Q7Z4F1 | Q7TQH7 |
| RefSeq (mRNA) | NM_014045; NM_001329226 | NM_022993 |
| RefSeq (protein) | NP_001316155; NP_054764 | NP_075369 |
| Location (UCSC) | Chr 14: 22.87 – 22.88 Mb | Chr 14: 54.7 – 54.71 Mb |
| PubMed search |
- Wikidata
| View/Edit Human | View/Edit Mouse |

Low-density lipoprotein receptor-related protein 10 is a protein that in humans is encoded by the LRP10 gene.
