= LRP11 =

Protein-coding gene in the species Homo sapiens

Identifiers
- Aliases: LRP11, MANSC3, bA350J20.3, LDL receptor related protein 11
- External IDs: MGI: 2442989; GeneCards: LRP11

Gene location (Human)
Chr.	Chromosome 6 (human)
Band	6q25.1	Start	149,818,757 bp
Band	6q25.1	End	149,864,359 bp

Gene location (Mouse)
Chr.	Chromosome 10 (mouse)
Band	10|10 A1	Start	7,465,564 bp
Band	10|10 A1	End	7,501,247 bp
RNA expression pattern
Bgee	Human / Mouse (ortholog); Top expressed in: islet of Langerhans; olfactory zone of nasal mucosa; stromal cell of endometrium; Achilles tendon; superior frontal gyrus; Brodmann area 9; prefrontal cortex; smooth muscle tissue; primary visual cortex; corpus callosum / Top expressed in: dentate gyrus of hippocampal formation granule cell; hippocampus proper; primary visual cortex; superior frontal gyrus; cerebellar cortex; striatum of neuraxis; hypothalamus; smooth muscle tissue; ganglionic eminence; layer of retina; More reference expression data
BioGPS	n/a
Gene ontology
Molecular function	phosphoprotein binding
Cellular component	plasma membrane; membrane; integral component of membrane
Biological process	response to immobilization stress; response to mechanical stimulus; response to cold; response to water deprivation; response to heat; multicellular organismal response to stress; response to starvation
Sources:Amigo / QuickGO
Orthologs
Databases	NCBI: entry; OMA: entry
Species	Human	Mouse
Entrez	84918	237253
Ensembl	ENSG00000120256	ENSMUSG00000019796
UniProt	Q86VZ4	Q8CB67
RefSeq (mRNA)	NM_032832	NM_172784; NM_001359742; NM_001359743; NM_001359744; NM_001379151 NM_001379152
RefSeq (protein)	NP_116221	NP_766372; NP_001346671; NP_001346672; NP_001346673; NP_001366080 NP_001366081
Location (UCSC)	Chr 6: 149.82 – 149.86 Mb	Chr 10: 7.47 – 7.5 Mb
PubMed search
- Wikidata
View/Edit Human	View/Edit Mouse

Low density lipoprotein receptor-related protein 11 is a protein in humans that is encoded by the LRP11 gene.
