= LRP3 =

Protein-coding gene in the species Homo sapiens

Identifiers
- Aliases: LRP3, LDL receptor related protein 3
- External IDs: OMIM: 603159; MGI: 3584516; GeneCards: LRP3

Gene location (Human)
Chr.	Chromosome 19 (human)
Band	19q13.11	Start	33,177,603 bp
Band	19q13.11	End	33,208,864 bp

Gene location (Mouse)
Chr.	Chromosome 7 (mouse)
Band	7|7 B2	Start	34,899,452 bp
Band	7|7 B2	End	34,914,923 bp
RNA expression pattern
Bgee	Human / Mouse (ortholog); Top expressed in: putamen; nucleus accumbens; caudate nucleus; left ovary; superior frontal gyrus; temporal lobe; right frontal lobe; amygdala; primary visual cortex; prefrontal cortex / Top expressed in: primary visual cortex; superior frontal gyrus; ventricular zone; dentate gyrus of hippocampal formation granule cell; cerebellar cortex; genital tubercle; ganglionic eminence; right kidney; tail of embryo; neural layer of retina; More reference expression data
BioGPS	n/a
Orthologs
Databases	NCBI: entry; OMA: entry
Species	Human	Mouse
Entrez	4037	435965
Ensembl	ENSG00000130881	ENSMUSG00000001802
UniProt	O75074	n/a
RefSeq (mRNA)	NM_002333	NM_001024707
RefSeq (protein)	NP_002324	n/a
Location (UCSC)	Chr 19: 33.18 – 33.21 Mb	Chr 7: 34.9 – 34.91 Mb
PubMed search
- Wikidata
View/Edit Human	View/Edit Mouse

Low density lipoprotein receptor-related protein 3 (LRP-3) is a protein that in humans is encoded by the LRP3 gene.
