= Soluble low-density lipoprotein receptor-related protein =

Soluble low-density lipoprotein receptor-related protein (sLRP, LRP-515) is a biological substance naturally produced by the human body. This protein has been found to bind to and neutralize anywhere from 70 to 90 percent of the amyloid-beta peptide that also naturally circulates in healthy human or mouse plasma. Impairment of this function is strongly associated with, and may soon be shown definitively to be the principal cause of, Alzheimer's disease.
