= LDL receptor =

Mammalian protein found in Homo sapiens

LDLR
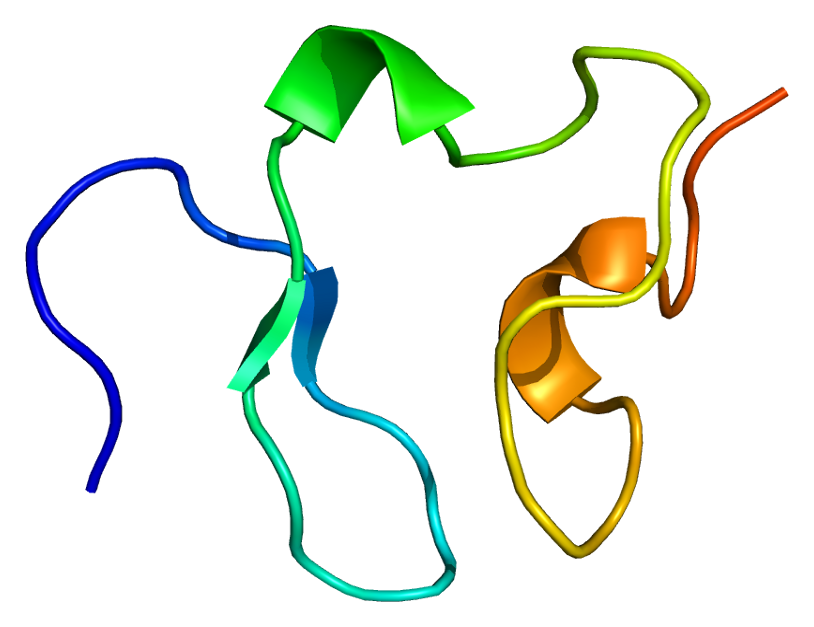

Identifiers
- Aliases: LDLR, FH, FHC, LDLCQ2, low density lipoprotein receptor, FHCL1
- External IDs: OMIM: 606945; MGI: 96765; GeneCards: LDLR
Available structures
PDB	Ortholog search: PDBe RCSB
PDB	List of PDB id codes 1AJJ, 1D2J, 1F5Y, 1HJ7, 1HZ8, 1I0U, 1IJQ, 1LDL, 1LDR, 1N7D, 1XFE, 2FCW, 2KRI, 2LGP, 2W2M, 2W2N, 2W2O, 2W2P, 2W2Q, 3BPS, 3GCW, 3GCX, 3M0C, 3SO6, 2M7P, 2MG9, 3P5B, 3P5C, 4NE9

Gene location (Human)
Chr.	Chromosome 19 (human)
Band	19p13.2	Start	11,089,462 bp
Band	19p13.2	End	11,133,820 bp

Gene location (Mouse)
Chr.	Chromosome 9 (mouse)
Band	9 A3|9 7.87 cM	Start	21,634,779 bp
Band	9 A3|9 7.87 cM	End	21,661,215 bp
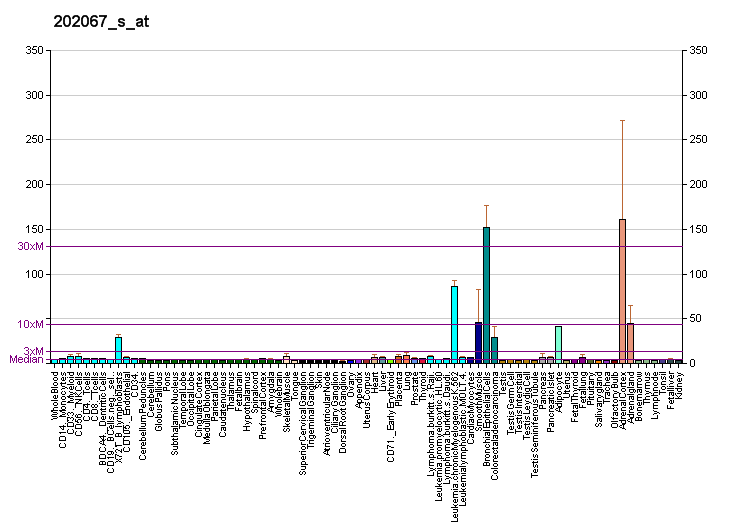

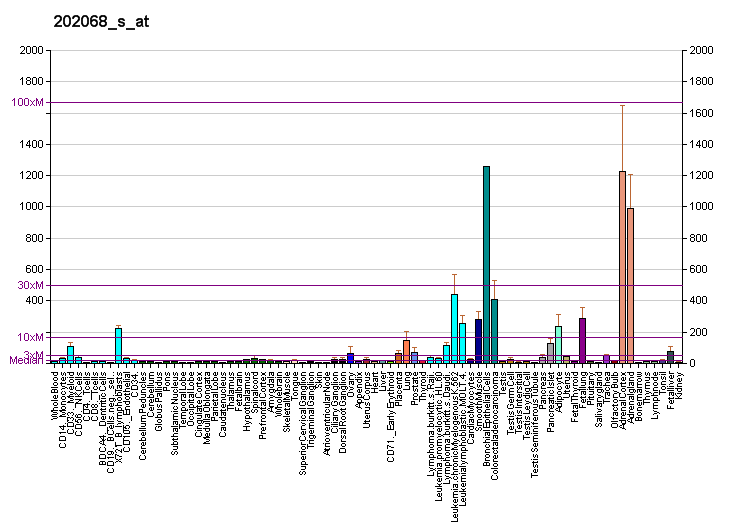

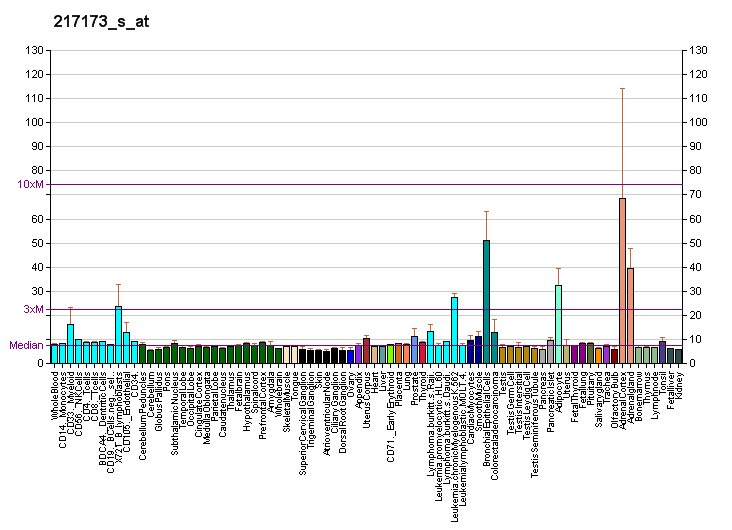
RNA expression pattern
Bgee	Human / Mouse (ortholog); Top expressed in: lower lobe of lung; right adrenal gland; right adrenal cortex; left adrenal gland; olfactory zone of nasal mucosa; left adrenal cortex; stromal cell of endometrium; upper lobe of lung; upper lobe of left lung; mucosa of urinary bladder / Top expressed in: cumulus cell; sciatic nerve; Ileal epithelium; gastrula; decidua; ascending aorta; endothelial cell of lymphatic vessel; stroma of bone marrow; otic placode; islet of Langerhans; More reference expression data
BioGPS	More reference expression data
Gene ontology
Molecular function	calcium ion binding; clathrin heavy chain binding; virus receptor activity; protein binding; protease binding; identical protein binding; very-low-density lipoprotein particle receptor activity; low-density lipoprotein particle receptor activity; low-density lipoprotein particle binding; amyloid-beta binding
Cellular component	integral component of membrane; clathrin-coated endocytic vesicle membrane; endosome; late endosome; Golgi apparatus; membrane; receptor complex; plasma membrane; apical part of cell; integral component of plasma membrane; cell surface; basolateral plasma membrane; early endosome; low-density lipoprotein particle; clathrin-coated pit; lysosome; PCSK9-LDLR complex; endosome membrane; external side of plasma membrane; extracellular space; endolysosome membrane; sorting endosome; intracellular anatomical structure; somatodendritic compartment
Biological process	positive regulation of triglyceride biosynthetic process; regulation of phosphatidylcholine catabolic process; steroid metabolic process; lipid transport; endocytosis; lipid metabolism; phospholipid transport; cholesterol transport; cholesterol metabolic process; lipoprotein catabolic process; intestinal cholesterol absorption; transport; viral entry into host cell; cholesterol homeostasis; viral process; positive regulation of gene expression; positive regulation of inflammatory response; lipoprotein metabolic process; cellular response to fatty acid; negative regulation of gene expression; membrane organization; cholesterol import; cellular response to low-density lipoprotein particle stimulus; receptor-mediated endocytosis involved in cholesterol transport; chylomicron remnant clearance; low-density lipoprotein particle clearance; receptor-mediated endocytosis; phagocytosis; long-term memory; plasma lipoprotein particle clearance; high-density lipoprotein particle clearance; regulation of protein metabolic process; negative regulation of protein metabolic process; response to caloric restriction; negative regulation of astrocyte activation; regulation of cholesterol metabolic process; amyloid-beta clearance; amyloid-beta clearance by cellular catabolic process; negative regulation of microglial cell activation; positive regulation of lysosomal protein catabolic process; negative regulation of amyloid fibril formation; artery morphogenesis
Sources:Amigo / QuickGO
Orthologs
Databases	NCBI: entry; OMA: entry
Species	Human	Mouse
Entrez	3949	16835
Ensembl	ENSG00000130164	ENSMUSG00000032193
UniProt	P01130	P35951
RefSeq (mRNA)	NM_000527; NM_001195798; NM_001195799; NM_001195800; NM_001195802 NM_001195803	NM_001252658; NM_001252659; NM_010700
RefSeq (protein)	NP_000518; NP_001182727; NP_001182728; NP_001182729; NP_001182732	NP_001239587; NP_001239588; NP_034830
Location (UCSC)	Chr 19: 11.09 – 11.13 Mb	Chr 9: 21.63 – 21.66 Mb
PubMed search
- Wikidata
View/Edit Human	View/Edit Mouse

The low-density lipoprotein receptor (LDL-R) is a mosaic protein of 839 amino acids (after removal of 21-amino acid signal peptide) that mediates the endocytosis of cholesterol-rich low-density lipoprotein (LDL). It is a cell-surface receptor that recognizes apolipoprotein B100 (ApoB100), which is embedded in the outer phospholipid layer of very low-density lipoprotein (VLDL), their remnants—i.e. intermediate-density lipoprotein (IDL), and LDL particles. The receptor also recognizes apolipoprotein E (ApoE) which is found in chylomicron remnants and IDL. In humans, the LDL receptor protein is encoded by the LDLR gene on chromosome 19. It belongs to the low density lipoprotein receptor gene family. It is most significantly expressed in bronchial epithelial cells and adrenal gland and cortex tissue.

Michael S. Brown and Joseph L. Goldstein were awarded the 1985 Nobel Prize in Physiology or Medicine for their identification of LDL-R and its relation to cholesterol metabolism and familial hypercholesterolemia. Disruption of LDL-R can lead to higher LDL-cholesterol as well as increasing the risk of related diseases. Individuals with disruptive mutations (defined as nonsense, splice site, or indel frameshift) in LDLR have an average LDL-cholesterol of 279 mg/dL, compared with 135 mg/dL for individuals with neither disruptive nor deleterious mutations. Disruptive mutations were 13 times more common in individuals with early-onset myocardial infarction or coronary artery disease than in individuals without either disease.

== Structure ==
=== Gene ===
The LDLR gene resides on chromosome 19 at the band 19p13.2 and is split into 18 exons. Exon 1 contains a signal sequence that localises the receptor to the endoplasmic reticulum for transport to the cell surface. Beyond this, exons 2-6 code the ligand binding region; 7-14 code the epidermal growth factor (EGF) domain; 15 codes the oligosaccharide rich region; 16 (and some of 17) code the membrane spanning region; and 18 (with the rest of 17) code the cytosolic domain.

This gene produces 6 isoforms through alternative splicing.

=== Protein ===
This protein belongs to the LDLR family and is made up of a number of functionally distinct domains, including 3 EGF-like domains, 7 LDL-R class A domains, and 6 LDL-R class B repeats.

The N-terminal domain of the LDL receptor, which is responsible for ligand binding, is composed of seven sequence repeats (~50% identical). Each repeat, referred to as a class A repeat or LDL-A, contains roughly 40 amino acids, including 6 cysteine residues that form disulfide bonds within the repeat. Additionally, each repeat has highly conserved acidic residues which it uses to coordinate a single calcium ion in an octahedral lattice. Both the disulfide bonds and calcium coordination are necessary for the structural integrity of the domain during the receptor's repeated trips to the highly acidic interior of the endosome. The exact mechanism of interaction between the class A repeats and ligand (LDL) is unknown, but it is thought that the repeats act as "grabbers" to hold the LDL. Binding of ApoB requires repeats 2-7 while binding ApoE requires only repeat 5 (thought to be the ancestral repeat).

Next to the ligand binding domain is an EGF precursor homology domain (EGFP domain). This shows approximately 30% homology with the EGF precursor gene. There are three "growth factor" repeats; A, B and C. A and B are closely linked while C is separated by the YWTD repeat region, which adopts a beta-propeller conformation (LDL-R class B domain). It is thought that this region is responsible for the pH-dependent conformational shift that causes bound LDL to be released in the endosome.

A third domain of the protein is rich in O-linked oligosaccharides but appears to show little function. Knockout experiments have confirmed that no significant loss of activity occurs without this domain. It has been speculated that the domain may have ancestrally acted as a spacer to push the receptor beyond the extracellular matrix.

The single transmembrane domain of 22 (mostly) non-polar residues crosses the plasma membrane in a single alpha helix.

The cytosolic C-terminal domain contains ~50 amino acids, including a signal sequence important for localizing the receptors to clathrin-coated pits and for triggering receptor-mediated endocytosis after binding. Portions of the cytosolic sequence have been found in other lipoprotein receptors, as well as in more distant receptor relatives.

=== Mutations ===
Loss-of-function mutations in the gene encoding the LDL receptor are known to cause familial hypercholesterolaemia.

There are 5 broad classes of mutation of the LDL receptor:

- Class 1 mutations affect the synthesis of the receptor in the endoplasmic reticulum (ER).
- Class 2 mutations prevent proper transport to the Golgi body needed for modifications to the receptor.
  - e.g. a truncation of the receptor protein at residue number 660 leads to domains 3,4 and 5 of the EGF precursor domain being missing. This precludes the movement of the receptor from the ER to the Golgi, and leads to degradation of the receptor protein.
- Class 3 mutations stop the binding of LDL to the receptor.
  - e.g. repeat 6 of the ligand binding domain (N-terminal, extracellular fluid) is deleted.
- Class 4 mutations inhibit the internalization of the receptor-ligand complex.
  - e.g. "JD" mutant results from a single point mutation in the NPVY domain (C-terminal, cytosolic; C residue converted to a Y, residue number 807). This domain recruits clathrin and other proteins responsible for the endocytosis of LDL, therefore this mutation inhibits LDL internalization.
- Class 5 mutations give rise to receptors that cannot recycle properly. This leads to a relatively mild phenotype as receptors are still present on the cell surface (but all must be newly synthesised).

Gain-of-function mutations decrease LDL levels and are a target of research to develop a gene therapy to treat refractory hypercholesterolemia.

== Function ==
LDL receptor mediates the endocytosis of cholesterol-rich LDL and thus maintains the plasma level of LDL. This occurs in all nucleated cells, but mainly in the liver which removes ~70% of LDL from the circulation. LDL receptors are clustered in clathrin-coated pits, and coated pits pinch off from the surface to form coated endocytic vesicles that carry LDL into the cell. After internalization, the receptors dissociate from their ligands when they are exposed to lower pH in endosomes. After dissociation, the receptor folds back on itself to obtain a closed conformation and recycles to the cell surface. The rapid recycling of LDL receptors provides an efficient mechanism for delivery of cholesterol to cells. It was also reported that by association with lipoprotein in the blood, viruses such as hepatitis C virus, Flaviviridae viruses and bovine viral diarrheal virus could enter cells indirectly via LDLR-mediated endocytosis. LDLR has been identified as the primary mode of entry for the Vesicular stomatitis virus in mice and humans. In addition, LDLR modulation is associated with early atherosclerosis-related lymphatic dysfunction. Synthesis of receptors in the cell is regulated by the level of free intracellular cholesterol; if it is in excess for the needs of the cell then the transcription of the receptor gene will be inhibited. LDL receptors are translated by ribosomes on the endoplasmic reticulum and are modified by the Golgi apparatus before travelling in vesicles to the cell surface.

== Clinical significance ==
In humans, LDL is directly involved in the development of atherosclerosis, which is the process responsible for the majority of cardiovascular diseases, due to accumulation of LDL-cholesterol in the blood. Hyperthyroidism may be associated with reduced cholesterol via upregulation of the LDL receptor, and hypothyroidism with the converse. A vast number of studies have described the relevance of LDL receptors in the pathophysiology of atherosclerosis, metabolic syndrome, and steatohepatitis. Previously, rare mutations in LDL-genes have been shown to contribute to myocardial infarction risk in individual families, whereas common variants at more than 45 loci have been associated with myocardial infarction risk in the population. When compared with non-carriers, LDLR mutation carriers had higher plasma LDL cholesterol, whereas APOA5 mutation carriers had higher plasma triglycerides. Recent evidence has connected MI risk with coding-sequence mutations at two genes functionally related to APOA5, namely lipoprotein lipase and apolipoprotein C-III. Combined, these observations suggest that, as well as LDL cholesterol, disordered metabolism of triglyceride-rich lipoproteins contributes to MI risk. Overall, LDLR has a high clinical relevance in blood lipids.

=== Clinical marker ===
A multi-locus genetic risk score study based on a combination of 27 loci, including the LDLR gene, identified individuals at increased risk for both incident and recurrent coronary artery disease events, as well as an enhanced clinical benefit from statin therapy. The study was based on a community cohort study (the Malmö Diet and Cancer study) and four additional randomized controlled trials of primary prevention cohorts (JUPITER and ASCOT) and secondary prevention cohorts (CARE and PROVE IT-TIMI 22).

== Interactive pathway map ==
Click on genes, proteins and metabolites below to link to respective articles. (Note: The interactive pathway map can be edited at WikiPathways: "Statin_Pathway_WP430".)

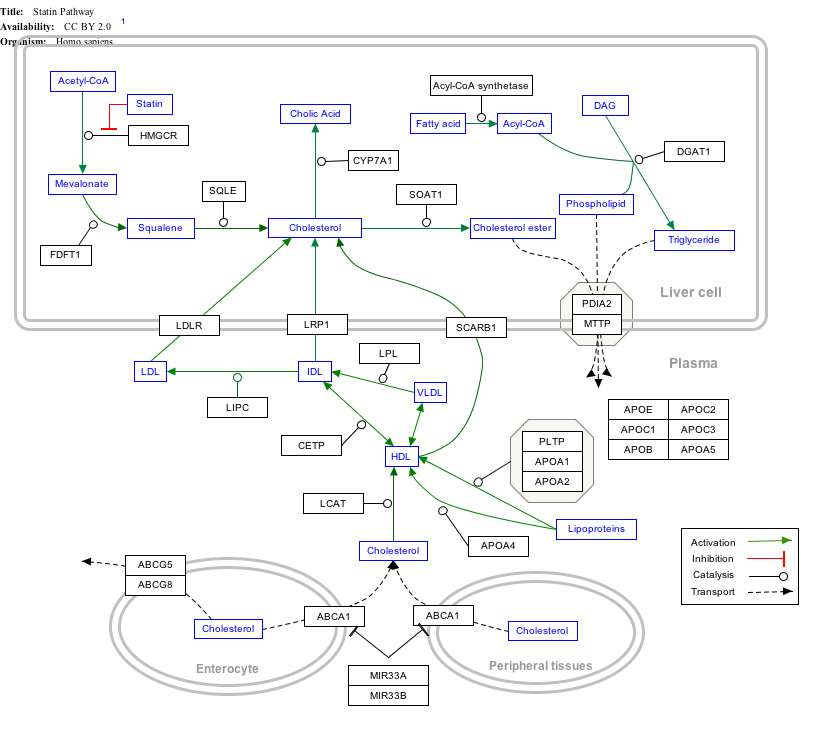

Statin pathway edit
