= Douglas Scott Falconer =

Scottish geneticist

Douglas Scott Falconer FRS FRSE
- Born: 10 March 1913; Oldmeldrum, Aberdeenshire, Scotland
- Died: 23 February 2004 (aged 90); Edinburgh, Scotland
- Education: University of St Andrews; University of Cambridge, Ph.D. 1943 (Honorary Sc.D., 1969)
- Known for: Falconer's formula; his book Introduction to quantitative genetics
- Scientific career
- Fields: Quantitative genetics Genetic epidemiology
- Institutions: University of Edinburgh
- Doctoral advisor: James Gray

Douglas Scott Falconer FRS FRSE (10 March 1913 in Oldmeldrum, Aberdeenshire – 23 February 2004 in Edinburgh) was a Scottish geneticist known for his work in quantitative genetics. Falconer's book Introduction to quantitative genetics was written in 1960 and became a valuable reference for generations of scientists. Its latest edition dates back to 1996 and is coauthored by Trudy Mackay.

Falconer graduated with first class honors in zoology from the University of St Andrews in 1940. He then received his PhD from the University of Cambridge in 1943. He eventually got an honorary ScD from Cambridge in 1969.

In 1951, Falconer described a novel mouse mutant that he called reeler for its peculiar gait. Later research using these mice has led to the discovery of reelin, a protein playing important roles in corticogenesis, neuronal migration, and plasticity.

In 1964, he introduced the use of liability threshold models into human disease & trait modeling.

In 1973, he was announced as a Fellow of the Royal Society (FRS).

== See also ==
- Falconer's formula
