= Pioneer neuron =

Type of cell

A pioneer neuron is a cell that is a derivative of the preplate in the early stages of corticogenesis of the brain. Pioneer neurons settle in the marginal zone of the cortex and project to sub-cortical levels. In the rat, pioneer neurons are only present in prenatal brains. Unlike Cajal-Retzius cells, these neurons are reelin-negative.

Pioneer neurons are born in the ventricular neuroepithelium all over the cortical primordium. In the rat cortex, they appear at embryonic day (E) 11.5 in the lateral aspect of the telencephalic vesicle and cover its whole surface on E12. These cells, which show intense immunoreactivity for calbindin and calretinin, are characterized by their large size and axonal projection. They remain in the marginal zone after the formation of the cortical plate; they project first into the ventricular zone, and then into the subplate and the internal capsule. Therefore, these cells are the origin of the earliest efferent pathway of the developing cortex.

== Function ==
It is thought that axons of pioneer neurons, pioneer axons, serve as a pathway for additional neurons that develop later in the embryo and project their axons to the appropriate target. In many systems pioneer neurons are eliminated by programmed cell-death and are not present in the adult.

== See also ==
- Neural development
