= Yotari =

The yotari mouse is an autosomal recessive mutant. It has a mutated disabled homolog 1 (Dab1) gene. This mutant mouse is recognized by unstable gait ("Yota-ru" in Japanese means "unstable gait") and tremor and by early deaths around the time of weaning. The cytoarchitectures of cerebellar and cerebral cortices and hippocampal formation of the yotari mouse are abnormal. These malformations resemble those of reeler mouse.
