= DAB1 =

Protein-coding gene in humans

Available structures
PDB	Ortholog search: PDBe RCSB
PDB	List of PDB id codes 1NTV, 1NU2, 1OQN

Identifiers
- Aliases: DAB1, reelin adaptor protein
- External IDs: OMIM: 603448; MGI: 108554; HomoloGene: 32084; GeneCards: DAB1; OMA:DAB1 - orthologs

Gene location (Mouse)
Chr.	Chromosome 4 (mouse)
Band	4 C6|4 47.79 cM	Start	103,619,359 bp
Band	4 C6|4 47.79 cM	End	104,744,844 bp
Gene ontology
Molecular function	protein binding; phosphatidylinositol 3-kinase binding
Cellular component	intracellular membrane-bounded organelle; membrane; postsynaptic density; apical part of cell; soma; brush border; perinuclear region of cytoplasm; neuron projection; cytosol; cytoplasm
Biological process	negative regulation of receptor signaling pathway via JAK-STAT; negative regulation of cell adhesion; cell differentiation; negative regulation of astrocyte differentiation; small GTPase mediated signal transduction; dendrite development; neuron migration; lateral motor column neuron migration; nervous system development; cerebellum structural organization; ventral spinal cord development; multicellular organism development; Golgi localization; negative regulation of axonogenesis; brain development; positive regulation of neuron differentiation; radial glia guided migration of Purkinje cell; cerebral cortex development; cell-cell adhesion involved in neuronal-glial interactions involved in cerebral cortex radial glia guided migration; cerebral cortex radially oriented cell migration; cerebral cortex cell migration; adult walking behavior; midgut development; positive regulation of protein kinase activity; axon guidance; hippocampus development
Sources:Amigo / QuickGO
Orthologs
Species	Human	Mouse
Entrez	1600	13131
Ensembl	ENSG00000173406	ENSMUSG00000028519
UniProt	O75553	P97318
RefSeq (mRNA)	NM_021080	NM_010014; NM_177259; NM_001369046; NM_001369047; NM_001369048 NM_001369049
RefSeq (protein)	NP_066566; NP_001340909; NP_001340912; NP_001340914; NP_001340915 NP_001352721; NP_001352722; NP_001352723; NP_001352724; NP_001366390; NP_001366391	NP_034144; NP_796233; NP_001355975; NP_001355976; NP_001355977 NP_001355978
Location (UCSC)	n/a	Chr 4: 103.62 – 104.74 Mb
PubMed search
- Wikidata
View/Edit Human	View/Edit Mouse

The Disabled-1 (Dab1) gene encodes a key regulator of Reelin signaling. Reelin is a large glycoprotein secreted by neurons of the developing brain, particularly Cajal-Retzius cells. DAB1 functions downstream of Reln in a signaling pathway that controls cell positioning in the developing brain and during adult neurogenesis. It docks to the intracellular part of the Reelin very low density lipoprotein receptor (VLDLR) and apoE receptor type 2 (ApoER2) and becomes tyrosine-phosphorylated following binding of Reelin to cortical neurons. In mice, mutations of Dab1 and Reelin generate identical phenotypes. In humans, Reelin mutations are associated with brain malformations and mental retardation. In mice, Dab1 mutation results in the scrambler mouse phenotype.

With a genomic length of 1.1 Mbp for a coding region of 5.5 kb, DAB1 provides a rare example of genomic complexity, which will impede the identification of human mutations.

== Gene function ==
Cortical neurons form in specialized proliferative regions deep in the brain and migrate past previously formed neurons to reach their proper layer. The laminar organization of multiple neuronal types in the cerebral cortex is required for normal cognitive function. The mouse 'reeler' mutation causes abnormal patterns of cortical neuronal migration as well as additional defects in cerebellar development and neuronal positioning in other brain regions. Reelin (RELN; 600514), the reeler gene product, is an extracellular protein secreted by pioneer neurons. The mouse 'scrambler' and 'yotari' recessive mutations exhibit a phenotype identical to that of reeler. Ware et al. (1997) determined that the scrambler phenotype arises from mutations in Dab1, a mouse gene related to the Drosophila gene 'disabled' (dab). Disabled-1 (Dab1) is an adaptor protein that is essential for the intracellular transduction of Reelin signaling, which regulates the migration and differentiation of postmitotic neurons during brain development in vertebrates. Dab1 function depends on its tyrosine phosphorylation by Src family kinases, especially Fyn. Dab encodes a phosphoprotein that binds nonreceptor tyrosine kinases and that has been implicated in neuronal development in flies. Sheldon et al. (1997) found that the yotari phenotype also results from a mutation in the Dab1 gene. Using in situ hybridization to embryonic day-13.5 mouse brain tissue, they demonstrated that Dab1 is expressed in neuronal populations exposed to reelin. The authors concluded that reelin and Dab1 function as signaling molecules that regulate cell positioning in the developing brain. Howell et al. (1997) showed that targeted disruption of the Dab1 gene disturbed neuronal layering in the cerebral cortex, hippocampus, and cerebellum, causing a reeler-like phenotype.

Layering of neurons in the cerebral cortex and cerebellum requires RELN and DAB1. By targeted disruption experiments in mice, Trommsdorff et al. (1999) showed that 2 cell surface receptors, very low density lipoprotein receptor (VLDLR; 192977) and apolipoprotein E receptor-2 (ApoER2; 602600), are also required. Both receptors bound Dab1 on their cytoplasmic tails and were expressed in cortical and cerebellar layers adjacent to layers expressing Reln. Dab1 expression was upregulated in knockout mice lacking both the Vldlr and Apoer2 genes. Inversion of cortical layers, absence of cerebellar foliation, and the migration of Purkinje cells in these animals precisely mimicked the phenotype of mice lacking Reln or Dab1. These findings established novel signaling functions for the LDL receptor gene family and suggested that VLDLR and APOER2 participate in transmitting the extracellular RELN signal to intracellular signaling processes initiated by DAB1.

In the reeler mouse, the telencephalic neurons (which are misplaced following migration) express approximately 10-fold more DAB1 than their wildtype counterpart. Such an increase in the expression of a protein that virtually functions as a receptor is expected to occur when the specific signal for the receptor is missing.

== Pathology ==
Mutations of the DAB1 gene can cause spinocerebellar ataxia type 37. The fact that mutations of the DAB1 gene are also linked to Alzheimer's disease (AD) has been explained by the hypothetic role of reelin signaling in AD.

== Gene variants and associated phenotypes in humans ==
In a study by Dr. Scott Williamson of Cornell University, a newer version of the DAB1 gene had been shown to be universal among those of Chinese ancestry, but not found among other global populations.
