= Rotatin =

Protein involved in cellular cilia maintenance and neuronal migration

RTTN

Identifiers
- Aliases: RTTN, MSSP, rotatin
- External IDs: OMIM: 610436; MGI: 2179288; GeneCards: RTTN

Gene location (Human)
Chr.	Chromosome 18 (human)
Band	18q22.2	Start	70,003,031 bp
Band	18q22.2	End	70,205,726 bp

Gene location (Mouse)
Chr.	Chromosome 18 (mouse)
Band	18|18 E4	Start	88,989,914 bp
Band	18|18 E4	End	89,149,140 bp
RNA expression pattern
Bgee	Human / Mouse (ortholog); Top expressed in: secondary oocyte; testicle; tibialis anterior muscle; Achilles tendon; gonad; corpus callosum; bone marrow cell; right lobe of liver; deltoid muscle; right testis / Top expressed in: zygote; secondary oocyte; primary oocyte; spermatocyte; tail of embryo; genital tubercle; Paneth cell; renal corpuscle; medullary collecting duct; ventricular zone; More reference expression data
BioGPS	n/a
Orthologs
Databases	NCBI: entry; OMA: entry
Species	Human	Mouse
Entrez	25914	246102
Ensembl	ENSG00000176225	ENSMUSG00000023066
UniProt	Q86VV8	Q8R4Y8
RefSeq (mRNA)	NM_173630; NM_001318520	NM_175542; NM_178063; NM_178064
RefSeq (protein)	NP_001305449; NP_775901	NP_780751
Location (UCSC)	Chr 18: 70 – 70.21 Mb	Chr 18: 88.99 – 89.15 Mb
PubMed search
- Wikidata
View/Edit Human	View/Edit Mouse

Rotatin is a protein that in humans is encoded by the RTTN gene. It is involved in the maintenance of cellular cilia and the radial migration of neurons in the cerebral cortex.

== Function ==
Rotatin is involved in the maintenance of ciliary basal bodies. Mutations in rotatin result in fewer, abnormally short cilia, with bulbous tips and multiple basal bodies. It is also involved in the radial migration of neurons in the cerebral cortex and localises in similar areas to the migration-guiding Cajal–Retzius cells. Its other roles include arrangement of the heart loops in heart development.

== Clinical significance ==
Mutations in both copies of rotatin cause a syndrome of microcephaly, short stature and polymicrogyria with or without seizures.

== History ==
The gene was first characterised in 2002 and was given its name for its role in the axial migration of heart loop development.
