= Low-density lipoprotein receptor-related protein 8 =

Cell surface receptor found in humans

LRP8

Identifiers
- Aliases: LRP8, APOER2, HSZ75190, LRP-8, MCI1, low density lipoprotein receptor-related protein 8, LDL receptor related protein 8
- External IDs: OMIM: 602600; MGI: 1340044; GeneCards: LRP8
Available structures
PDB	Ortholog search: PDBe RCSB
PDB	List of PDB id codes 3A7Q

Gene location (Human)
Chr.	Chromosome 1 (human)
Band	1p32.3	Start	53,242,364 bp
Band	1p32.3	End	53,328,469 bp

Gene location (Mouse)
Chr.	Chromosome 4 (mouse)
Band	4|4 C7	Start	107,801,869 bp
Band	4|4 C7	End	107,876,840 bp
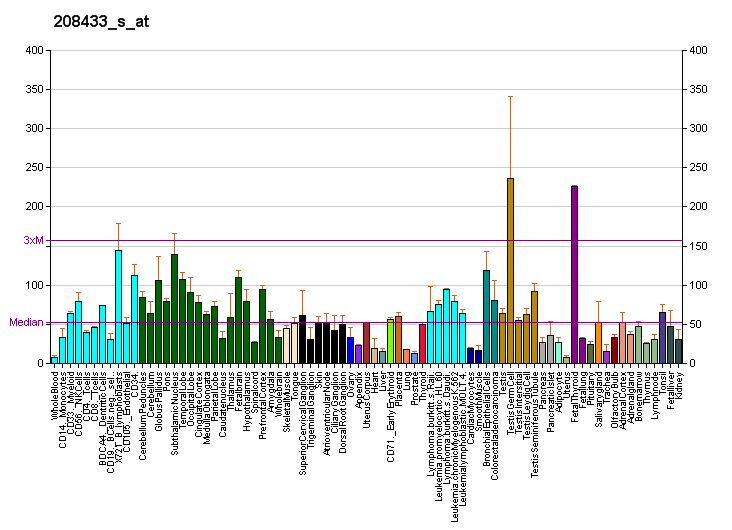

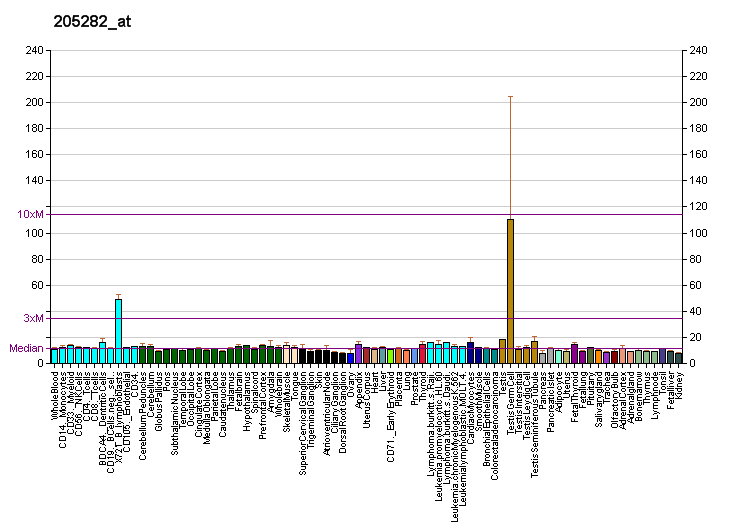
RNA expression pattern
Bgee	Human / Mouse (ortholog); Top expressed in: ganglionic eminence; retinal pigment epithelium; ventricular zone; right testis; left testis; right lobe of thyroid gland; pons; left lobe of thyroid gland; lateral nuclear group of thalamus; Brodmann area 46 / Top expressed in: ventricular zone; Rostral migratory stream; ganglionic eminence; habenula; neural layer of retina; olfactory bulb; tail of embryo; cerebellar cortex; primary visual cortex; superior frontal gyrus; More reference expression data
BioGPS	More reference expression data
Gene ontology
Molecular function	reelin receptor activity; calcium ion binding; apolipoprotein binding; protein binding; kinesin binding; high-density lipoprotein particle binding; very-low-density lipoprotein particle receptor activity; transmembrane signaling receptor activity; low-density lipoprotein particle receptor activity
Cellular component	integral component of membrane; membrane; postsynaptic density; receptor complex; plasma membrane; microtubule associated complex; extracellular region; axon; soma; dendrite; caveola
Biological process	endocytosis; ammon gyrus development; lipid metabolism; cytokine-mediated signaling pathway; cellular response to growth factor stimulus; positive regulation of protein tyrosine kinase activity; modulation of chemical synaptic transmission; negative regulation of transcription by RNA polymerase II; positive regulation of dendrite development; cellular response to cholesterol; proteolysis; retinoid metabolic process; reelin-mediated signaling pathway; positive regulation of CREB transcription factor activity; cerebral cortex development; positive regulation of peptidyl-tyrosine phosphorylation; positive regulation of dendritic spine morphogenesis; signal transduction; receptor-mediated endocytosis; regulation of apoptotic process; regulation of innate immune response
Sources:Amigo / QuickGO
Orthologs
Databases	NCBI: entry; OMA: entry
Species	Human	Mouse
Entrez	7804	16975
Ensembl	ENSG00000157193	ENSMUSG00000028613
UniProt	Q14114	Q924X6
RefSeq (mRNA)	NM_001018054; NM_004631; NM_017522; NM_033300	NM_001080926; NM_053073; NM_001369051; NM_001369052; NM_001369053 NM_001369054
RefSeq (protein)	NP_001018064; NP_004622; NP_059992; NP_150643	NP_001074395; NP_001355980; NP_001355981; NP_001355982; NP_001355983 NP_444303
Location (UCSC)	Chr 1: 53.24 – 53.33 Mb	Chr 4: 107.8 – 107.88 Mb
PubMed search
- Wikidata
View/Edit Human	View/Edit Mouse

Low-density lipoprotein receptor-related protein 8 (LRP8), also known as apolipoprotein E receptor 2 (ApoER2), is a protein that in humans is encoded by the LRP8 gene. ApoER2 is a cell surface receptor that is part of the low-density lipoprotein receptor family. These receptors function in signal transduction and endocytosis of specific ligands. Through interactions with one of its ligands, reelin, ApoER2 plays an important role in embryonic neuronal migration and postnatal long-term potentiation. Another LDL family receptor, VLDLR, also interacts with reelin, and together these two receptors influence brain development and function. Decreased expression of ApoER2 is associated with certain neurological diseases.

== Structure ==
ApoER2 is a protein made up of 870 amino acids. It is separated into a ligand binding domain of eight ligand binding regions, an EGF-like domain containing three cysteine-rich repeats, an O-linked glycosylation domain of 89 amino acids, a transmembrane domain of 24 amino acids, and a cytoplasmic domain of 115 amino acids, including an NPXY motif.

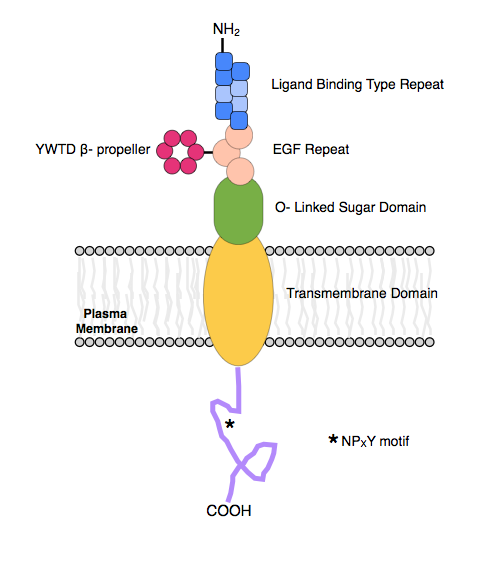
Structure for APOER2 (extracellular to intracellular): a ligand binding repeat, EGF repeat, YWTD-β propeller, O-linked sugar domain, transmembrane domain, and a cytoplasmic tail containing an NPxY motif

Each letter in the NPXY motif represents a certain amino acid where N is arginine, P is proline, X is any amino acid, and Y is tyrosine.

=== Cytoplasmic tail ===
All LDL receptor family proteins contain a cytoplasmic tail with at least one NPXY motif. This motif is important for binding intracellular adapter proteins and endocytosis. ApoER2 is distinct from most other members of the LDL family of receptors due to a unique insert on its cytoplasmic tail. In ApoER2, there is a proline-rich 59 amino acid insert encoded by the alternatively spliced exon 19. This insert allows for protein interactions that are unable to occur with other LDL receptors. It binds the PSD-95 adapter protein, cross-linking ApoER2 and the NMDA receptors during the process of long-term potentiation, and is also bound specifically by JIP-2, an important interaction in the JNK signalling pathway. It is also speculated that this insert may diminish the function of ApoER2 in lipoprotein endocytosis by somehow disrupting the NPXY motif.

== Function ==
=== Reelin/Dab1 signalling pathway ===
ApoER2 plays a critical role as a receptor in the reelin signalling pathway, which is important for brain development and postnatal function of the brain. This pathway specifically affects cortical migration and long-term potentiation.

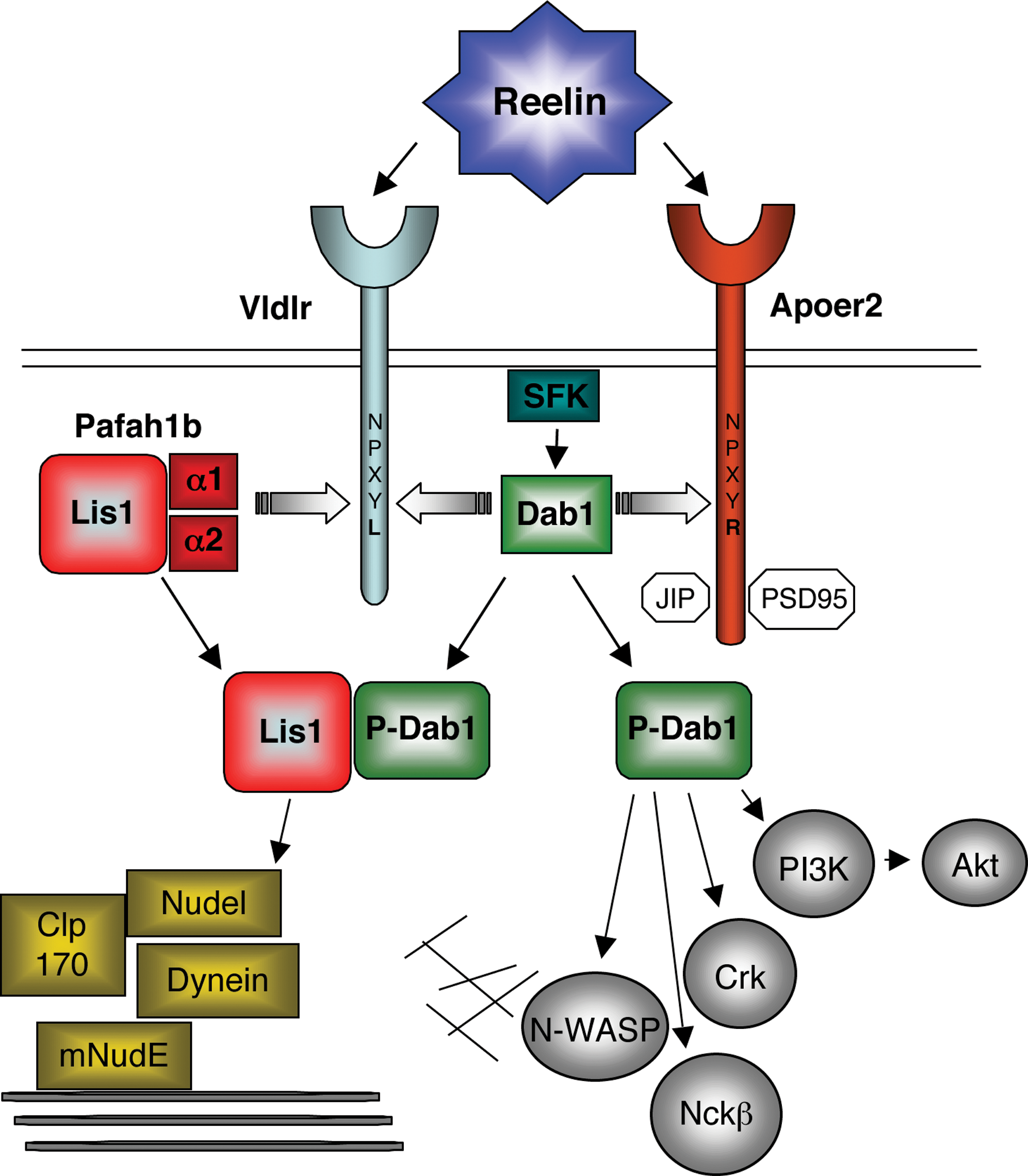
Reelin signaling pathway is initiated by phosphorylation of Dab1 to cause a downstream signal cascade activating multiple kinases including PI3K.

==== Cortical migration ====
In development, reelin is secreted by Cajal-Retzius cells. Reelin acts as an extracellular ligand binding to ApoER2 and VLDLR on migrating neurons. A specific lysine residue on reelin binds to the first repeat on the ligand binding domain of ApoER2. This interaction with the two receptors activates intracellular processes that begin with the phosphorylation of Dab1, a tyrosine kinase phosphorylated protein which is encoded by the DAB1 gene. This protein associates with the NPXY motifs on the intracellular tails of ApoER2 and VLDLR. Upon reelin binding, Dab1 is phosphorylated by two tyrosine kinases, Fyn and Src. The phosphorylated Dab1 then causes further activation of these two kinases and others, including a phosphatidylinositol-3-kinase (PI3K). PI3K activation leads to inhibitory phosphorylation of the tau kinase glycogen synthase kinase 3 beta (GSK3B), which alters the activity of tau protein, a protein involved in stabilizing microtubules. This transduction is combined with the activation of other pathways that influence the cytoskeletal rearrangement necessary for proper cortical cell migration.

The result of proper neuronal migration through the cortical plate (CP) is an inside-out arrangement of neurons, where the younger neurons migrate past the older neurons to their proper locations. Studies in reeler mutant mice show that knocking out the reeler gene results in aberrant migration as well as outside-in layering, in which younger neurons are unable to travel past the older ones. Such abnormal layering is also seen in VLDLR−apoER2− and dab1- mutants, indicating the importance of this entire pathway in cortical migration of the developing embryo.

There is some confusion as to the exact function of the reelin-signalling pathway in the process of cortical migration. Some studies have shown that reelin release is necessary for the initiation of cell movement to its proper location, whereas others have shown that it is part of the process of terminating migration. These conflicting results have led researchers to speculate that it plays a role in both processes through interactions with different molecules at different stages of neuronal migration.

==== Long-term potentiation ====
After development, reelin is secreted in the cortex and hippocampus by gamma-aminobutyric acid-ergic interneurons. Through binding of ApoER2 in the hippocampus, it plays a role in the NMDA receptor activation that is required for long-term potentiation, a mechanism by which two neurons gain a stronger, longer-lasting transmission due to simultaneous firing. The increased synaptic plasticity associated with this process is essential in development of memory and spatial learning. Studies with mice have shown less expression of ApoER2 leads to impaired spatial learning, fear conditioned learning, and a mild disruption to the hippocampus.

In the hippocampus, ApoER2 is complexed with NMDA receptors through the PSD-95 adapter protein. When reelin binds ApoER2, it initiates tyrosine phosphorylation of NMDA receptors. This occurs through Dab-1 activation of Src family kinases, which have been shown to play a role in regulating synaptic plasticity. VLDLR also acts as a receptor coupled to ApoER2 as it does during development, but its role is not well understood. ApoER2 plays a more important role in this process, most likely due to its ability to bind the PSD-95 adapter protein through the 59 amino acid insert on its cytoplasmic tail. Studies with mice have shown that knocking out ApoER2 or just the alternatively spliced exon 19 causes a much greater impairment of LTP than knocking out VLDLR.

=== Lipoprotein endocytosis ===
ApoER2 is a major receptor for apolipoprotein E in the brain and is involved in the endocytosis of lipoproteins there.

== Other interacting proteins ==
=== Apolipoprotein E ===
Apolipoprotein E (ApoE) plays an important role in phospholipid and cholesterol homeostasis. After binding ApoER2, ApoE is taken up into the cell and may remain in the intracellular space, be shipped to the cell surface, or be degraded. ApoE binding leads to the cleavage of ApoER2 into secreted proteins by the actions of the plasma membrane protein gamma secretase. ApoE may be the signalling ligand responsible for ApoER2's role in modulating the JNK signalling pathway.

=== FE65 ===
FE65 is an intracellular protein that binds to the NPXY motif of ApoER2 and plays a role in linking other proteins, such as amyloid precursor protein, to ApoER2. This protein aids in a cell's migrational functions. Knockout studies of FE65 have shown a link to lissencephaly.

=== JIP1 and JIP2 ===
JIP1 and JIP2 are involved in the JNK-signaling pathway and interact with exon 19 of ApoER2. For JIP2, interaction with exon 19 of ApoER2 is through the PID domain. This interaction has led researchers to believe that ApoER2 is involved in many interactions at the surface of cells.

=== Selenoprotein P ===
Selenoprotein P transports the trace element selenium from the liver to the testes and brain, and binds to ApoER2 in these areas. ApoER2 functions to internalize this complex to maintain normal levels of selenium in these cells. Selenium is necessary in the testes for proper spermatozoa development. Mice that have had their ApoER2 or Selenoprotein P expression knocked out show impaired spermatozoa development and decreased fertility. In the brain, deficiencies in selenium and selenium uptake mechanisms result in brain damage.

=== Thrombospondin and F-spondin ===
Thrombospondin is a protein found in the extracellular matrix that competes with reelin to bind ApoER2. It is involved with cell-to-cell communication and migration of neurons, and causes the activation of Dab1. F-spondin is a secreted protein that also binds ApoER2 and leads to phosphorylation of Dab1.

== Clinical significance ==
=== Alzheimer's disease ===
Alzheimer's disease is the most common form of dementia, and studies have shown that manipulation of pathways involving LRP8/ApoER2 can lead to the disease. Certain alleles, such as apoe, app, ps1 and ps2, may lead to being genetically predisposed to the disease. A decrease in LRP8 expression is observed in patients with Alzheimer's disease. An example of a decrease in expression of LRP8 is when gamma secretase cleaves LRP8 as well as the ligand amyloid precursor protein (APP). The degradation products control transcription factors, which lead to the expression of a tau protein. The cascade dysfunction caused by the altered gene expression may be implicated with Alzheimer's disease.

The presence of amyloid beta (Aβ) protein deposits in neuronal extracellular space is one of the hallmarks of Alzheimer's disease. The role of ApoER2 in Alzheimer's disease is relevant, yet incompletely understood. New evidence suggests ApoER2 plays a major role in the regulation of amyloid-β formation in the brain. The amyloid-β peptide is derived from the cleavage of APP by gamma secretase. ApoER2 works to reduce APP trafficking by altering break down. This interaction decreases APP endocytosis leading to an increase in amyloid-β production. In addition, the expression of ApoER2 within intracellular compartments leads to increased gamma secretase activity, a protease which works to cleave APP into Aβ.

ApoER2 splice variants can act as a receptor for alpha-2-macroglobulin which can have a role in clearance of alpha-2-macroglobulin/proteinase complex. Proteases may play a role in synaptic plasticity balancing proteolytic activity and inhibition, which is controlled by proteolytic inhibitors such as alpha-2-macroglobulin. Studies have shown that a high presence of alpha-2-macroglobulin is present in the neuritic plaques in many Alzheimer patients. Isolation of cDNA encoding proteins associated with Aβ was used to discover alpha-2-macroglobulin. These discoveries may link alpha-2-macroglobulin and its receptors, one of them being ApoER2, to Alzheimer's disease.

ApoER2 interaction with reelin and ApoE has implications with Alzheimer's disease. Binding of reelin to ApoER2 leads to cascade of signals that modulate NMDA receptor functions. ApoE competes with reelin in binding to ApoER2 resulting in weakened reelin signaling. Reduced reelin signaling leads to impaired plasticity in neurons and increases in the phosphorylation of tau protein, which is a microtubule stabilizing protein that is abundant in the central nervous system (CNS), producing neurofibrillary tangles which are implicated in Alzheimer's disease.

=== Antiphospholipid syndrome ===
Antiphospholipid syndrome is an autoimmune disease characterized by thrombosis and complications during pregnancy, often leading to fetal death. It is caused by the presence of antibodies against anionic phospholipids and β2-glycoprotein I (β2GPI). The anti-β2GPI antibodies are most prevalent in causing the symptoms of the disease. When bound by an antibody, β2GPI begins to interact with monocytes, endothelial cells, and platelets. ApoER2 is thought to play a key role in the process of platelet binding. β2GPI has the proper binding site for interaction with ApoER2 and other LDL family receptors, and it is speculated that the antibody/β2GPI complexes interact with ApoER2 on platelets. This causes the phosphorylation of a p38MAPkinase, resulting in the production of thromboxane A2. Thromboxane A2 functions to activate more platelets, and this leads to a greater chance for blood clots to form. There is also speculation that the antibody/β2GPI complexes sensitize other cell types through various LDL family receptors to lead to less common symptoms other than thrombosis.

=== Cancer ===
ApoER2 has been found to promote ferroptosis resistance in cancer. Loss of ApoER2 results in insufficient selenium levels, leading to failed translation of the key ferroptosis regulator and selenoprotein GPX4.

=== Major depressive disorder ===
Reduced expression of ApoER2 in peripheral blood lymphocytes can contribute to major depressive disorder (MDD) in some patients. Major depressive disorder is the most common psychiatric disorder, where people show symptoms of low self-esteem and a loss of interest in pleasure. By studying the levels of ApoER2 mRNA, low levels of ApoER2 were discovered. Results from experiments have shown that this could be because of transcriptional alterations in lymphocytes. However, low levels of ApoER2 do not appear to correlate with the severity or duration of the disease. It only aids as a trait marker in identification of the disease. The impact of the low levels of ApoER2 mRNA function relating to the disease remains unknown.
