= Scrambler mouse =

Mouse mutant

Scrambler is a spontaneous mouse mutant lacking a functional DAB1 gene, causing abnormal cortical development and a phenotype similar to that of the reeler mouse. The strain was first described by Sweet et al. in 1996 as a neurological mutation associated with abnormalities of neuronal migration.

== Neuroanatomical abnormalities ==
The spontaneous autosomal recessive scrambler mutation on chromosome 4 causes a deficiency of DAB1, encoding disabled-1, a protein involved in the signaling of the Reelin protein, lacking in the reeler mutant, Dab1-scm homozygous mutants possess a reeler-like phenotype with respect to cell malpositioning in cerebellar cortex, hippocampus, and neocortex. Purkinje cell and granule cell degeneration results in ataxia. Despite normal Reln mRNA levels, Dab1-scm mutants have defective reelin signaling, indicating that disabled-1 acts downstream of reelin. Cell ectopias are identical with targeted disruption of Dab1.

== Behavioral abnormalities ==
Dab1-scm mutants have a widespread gait obvious to the naked eye (ataxia). In their home-cage, they often reel and fall, especially when attempting to rear up against the walls. Nevertheless, the mutants are fertile, and so can be reproduced from one generation to the next. Relative to non-ataxic controls of the same background strain, Dab1-scm mutants were impaired in the Rotarod Performance test of motor coordination and a grid-climbing test. When picked up by the tail, they show a pathological reflex, limb-clasping, characterized by holding together fore- or hind-limbs, or all four together in a bat-like posture.

Dab1-scm mutants were distinguished from non-ataxic controls as early as postnatal day 8 based on body tremor, gait anomalies, and body weight. On postnatal day 15, motor coordination deficits were evident on horizontal bar and inclined or vertical grid tests in association with a weaker grip strength. Further differences were detected on postnatal day 22 and evaluation at the adult age revealed impairments indicative of permanent motor alterations.

As adults, Dab1(scm) mutants showed motor coordination impairments on stationary beam, coat-hanger, and rotorod tests but were more active in the open-field. Dab1(scm) mutants were also less anxious in the elevated plus-maze but with higher latencies in the emergence test. In mutants versus controls, changes in regional brain metabolism as measured by cytochrome oxidase (COX) activity occurred mainly in structures intimately connected with the cerebellum.

In addition to motor deficits, adult Dab1-scm mutants are characterized by anomalies in grooming behavior, in particular shorter grooming bouts than non-ataxic controls of the same background strain, though they display the normal cephalocaudal sequence of grooming anterior body parts (face washing and forelimb licking) prior to posterior parts. Dab1-scm mutants are also characterized by reduced spontaneous alternation rates and deficits in visuomotor control while swimming towards a visible platform.
