= Alanine–tRNA ligase =

Class of enzymes

Identifiers
- EC no.: 6.1.1.7
- CAS no.: 9031-71-4

Databases
- IntEnz: IntEnz view
- BRENDA: BRENDA entry
- ExPASy: NiceZyme view
- KEGG: KEGG entry
- MetaCyc: metabolic pathway
- PRIAM: profile
- PDB structures: RCSB PDB PDBe PDBsum
- Gene Ontology: AmiGO / QuickGO
Search
- PMC: articles
- PubMed: articles
- NCBI: proteins

In enzymology, an alanine–tRNA ligase (EC 6.1.1.7) is an enzyme that catalyzes the chemical reaction

ATP + L-alanine + tRNA^{Ala} $\rightleftharpoons$ AMP + diphosphate + L-alanyl-tRNA^{Ala}

The 3 substrates of this enzyme are ATP, L-alanine, and tRNA^{Ala}, whereas its 3 products are AMP, diphosphate, and L-alanyl-tRNA^{Ala}.

This enzyme belongs to the family of ligases, to be specific those forming carbon–oxygen bonds in aminoacyl-tRNA and related compounds. The systematic name of this enzyme class is L-alanine:tRNA^{Ala} ligase (AMP-forming). Other names in common use include alanyl-tRNA synthetase, alanyl-transfer ribonucleate synthetase, alanyl-transfer RNA synthetase, alanyl-transfer ribonucleic acid synthetase, alanine-transfer RNA ligase, alanine transfer RNA synthetase, alanine tRNA synthetase, alanine translase, alanyl-transfer ribonucleate synthase, AlaRS, and Ala-tRNA synthetase. This enzyme participates in alanine and aspartate metabolism and aminoacyl-tRNA biosynthesis.

== See also ==
- Sticky mouse - mutation in the gene

== Structural studies ==
As of late 2007, 7 structures have been solved for this class of enzymes, with PDB accession codes 1RIQ, 1V4P, 1YFR, 1YFS, 1YFT, 1YGB, and 2E1B.
