= Development of the cerebral cortex =

Biological process

The development of the cerebral cortex, known as corticogenesis is the process during which the cerebral cortex of the brain is formed as part of the development of the nervous system of mammals including its development in humans. The cortex is the outer layer of the brain and is composed of up to six layers. Neurons formed in the ventricular zone migrate to their final locations in one of the six layers of the cortex. The process occurs from embryonic day 10 to 17 in mice and between gestational weeks seven to 18 in humans.

The cortex is the outermost layer of the brain and consists primarily of gray matter, or neuronal cell bodies. Interior areas of the brain consist of myelinated axons and appear as white matter.

== Cortical plates ==
=== Preplate ===
The preplate is the first stage in corticogenesis prior to the development of the cortical plate. The preplate is located between the pia mater and the ventricular zone. According to current knowledge, the preplate contains the first-born or pioneer neurons. These neurons are mainly thought to be Cajal-Retzius cells, a transient cell type that signals for cell migration and organization.

=== Subplate ===
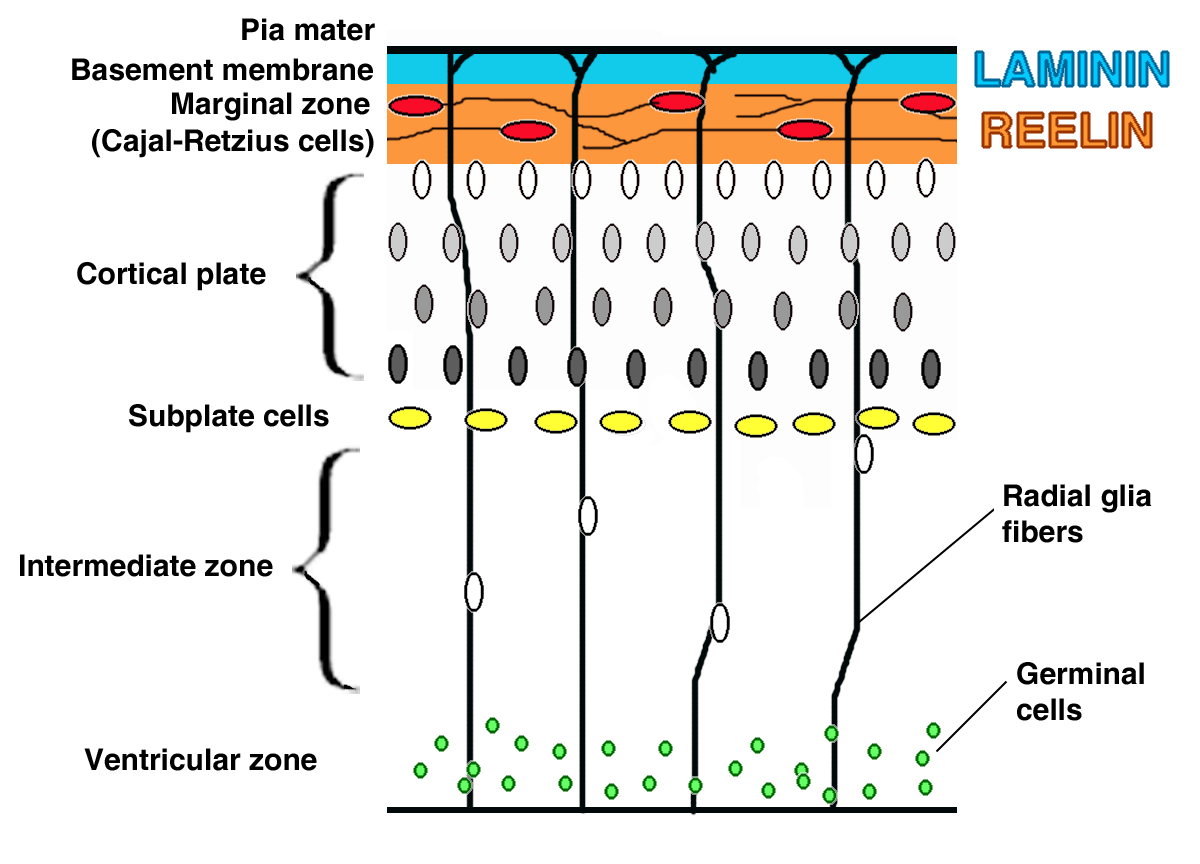
Visualization of corticogenesis in the mouse. The 6 cortex layers migrate from the ventricular zone through the subplate to come to rest in the cortical plate (layers 2 through 6) or in the marginal zone (layer 1)

The preplate also contains the predecessor to the subplate, which is sometimes referred to as a layer. As the cortical plate appears, the preplate separates into two components. The Cajal-Retzius cells go into the marginal zone, above the cortical plate, while the subplate moves inferior to the 6 cortical layers.

Appropriate functioning and development of the subplate is highly dependent upon organization and connectivity. Disruptions during the transition from preplate to cortical plate can lead to significant malformation and disruption in function of the thalamus, inhibitory neuron activity, and maturation of cortical response. Injuries during the second trimester of human development have been associated with disorders such as cerebral palsy and epilepsy.

The cortical plate is the final plate formed in corticogenesis. It includes cortical layers two through six.

The subplate is located beneath the cortical plate. It is named for both its location relative to the cortical plate and for the time frame in which it is created. While the cortical plate matures, the cells located in the subplate establish connections with neurons that have not yet moved to their destination layer within the cortical plate.

Pioneer cells are also present in the subplate and work to create neuronal synapses within the plate. In early development, synaptic connections and circuits continue to proliferate at an exponential rate.

== Cortical zones ==
In humans the intermediate zone is located between the ventricular zone and the cortical plate. The intermediate zone contains bipolar cells and multipolar cells. The multipolar cells have a special type of migration known as multipolar migration, they do not resemble the cells migrating by locomotion or somal translocation. Instead these multipolar cells express neuronal markers and extend multiple thin processes in various directions independently of the radial glial fibers. This zone is only present during corticogenesis and eventually transforms into adult white matter.

The ventricular and subventricular zones exist inferior to the intermediate zone and communicate with other zones through cell signalling. These zones additionally create neurons destined to migrate to other areas in the cortex.

The marginal zone, along with the cortical zone, make up the 6 layers that form the cortex. This zone is the predecessor for layer I of the cortex. Astrocytes form an outer limiting membrane to interact with the pia. In humans it has been found that the cells here also form a subpial layer. Cajal-Retzius cells are also present in this zone and release reelin along the radial axis, a key signaling molecule in neuronal migration during corticogenesis.

== Formation of layers ==
The cerebral cortex is divided into layers. Each layer is formed by radial glial cells located in the ventricular zone or subventricular zone, and then migrate to their final destination.

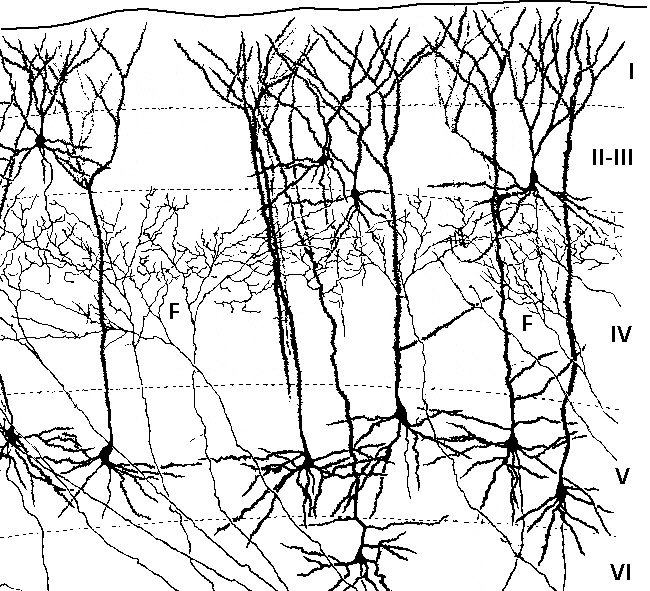
Layers of the cerebral cortex, oriented from most superficial (top of image) to deepest (bottom of image).

=== Layer I ===
Layer I, the molecular layer, is the first cortical layer produced during neurogenesis at mice at embryonal days 10.5 to 12.5 (E10.5 to E12.5). Of the six layers found within the neocortex, layer I is the most superficial and is composed of Cajal–Retzius cells and pyramidal cells. This layer is unique in the aspect that these cells migrate to the outer edge of the cortex opposed to the migration experienced by the other 5 layers. Layer I is also characterized by expression of reelin, transcription factor T-box brain 1, and cortical migratory neuronal marker.

=== Layers II and III ===
The second and third layers, or the external granular layer and external pyramidal layer respectively, are formed around mouse embryonal ages 13.5 to 16 days (E13.5 to E16). These layers are the last to form during corticogenesis and include pyramidal neurons, astrocytes, Stellates, and radial glial cells.

In humans the pyramidal and stellate neurons express SATB2 and CUX1. SATB2 and CUX1 are DNA binding proteins involved in determining the fate of cortical cells.

=== Layers IV, V, and VI ===
The fourth, fifth and sixth layers, or the internal granular layer, internal pyramidal layer, and multiform layer, respectively, are formed during mouse E11.5 to E14.5. Included in these layers are stellates, radial glia, and pyramidal neurons. Layer VI is adjacent to the ventricular zone. During the production of these layers, transcription factors TBR1 and OTX1 are expressed along with CTIP2, or corticoneuronal zinc finger protein.

== Neuronal migration ==
Neuronal migration plays significant role in corticogenesis. Throughout the process of creating the six cortical layers, all the neurons and cells migrate from the ventricular zone, through the subplate, and come to rest at their appropriate layer of the cortex. Neuronal migration is generally subdivided into radial migration, tangential migration and multipolar migration. The migration of subcortical brain functions to the cortex is known as corticalization.

== Cell signaling ==
Appropriate formation of the cerebral cortex relies heavily on a densely intertwined network of multiple signaling pathways and distinct signaling molecules. While the majority of the process remains to be understood, some signals and pathways have been carefully unraveled in an effort to gain full knowledge of the mechanisms that control corticogenesis.

=== Reelin-DAB1 pathway ===
The Reelin-DAB1 pathway is a well-defined pathway involved in corticogenesis. Cajal-Retzius cells located in the marginal zone secrete reelin to start the cascade. Reelin is able to interact with specific neurons in the cortical plate and direct these neurons to their proper locations. It is thought that the result downstream from this signalling could influence the cytoskeleton. Reelin is secreted only by the Cajal-Retzius cells located in the marginal zone, and its receptors are confined to the cortical plate. This segregation could be used to understand the actions of Reelin.

DAB1 is a regulator protein downstream of the reelin receptors. This protein is located inside cells residing in the ventricular zone, displaying highest concentrations in migrating pyramidal cells. When either reelin or DAB1 are inactivated in mice, the resulting phenotypes are the same. In this case, the neurons are unable to migrate properly through the cortical plate. It does not affect the proliferation of neurons and in the wild does not seem to have detrimental effects on memory or learning.

=== Sonic hedgehog ===
Knocking out the Sonic hedgehog, or Shh, has been shown to severely affect corticogenesis in the genetically modified mice. The ventral and dorsal sides of the cerebrum are affected as Shh expresses the transcription factors to Nkx2 which is important in patterning the cortex. Shh is also important to corticogenesis as it affects cell proliferation and differentiation, helping neuronal progenitor cells in fate determination.

=== Bmp-7 ===
In mice, bone morphogenetic protein 7 (Bmp-7), is an important regulator in corticogenesis, though it is not understood whether it promotes or inhibits neurogenesis. Bmp-7 can be detected in the ventricular zone and is secreted into cerebrospinal fluid (CSF). The CSF is an area to promote neurogenesis and it is believed that the synergy between Bmp-7 and other regulators promote cell division along with homeostasis.

Other bone morphogenetic proteins are also known to impact corticogenesis in the mouse. Bmp2, 4, 5, and 6 are expressed during the process and can compensate for one another. For example, if Bmp-4 was absent from corticogenesis, very little would change in the cortex phenotype, due to the other Bmps helping accomplish the tasks of Bmp-4. However, Bmp-7 is the only Bmp that promotes radial glia survival and therefore considered more important.

=== Cdk5-p35 pathway ===
Cdk5 has a pathway parallel to the Reelin-DAB1. This pathway affects the neuronal positioning, and results in similar malformations when absent as the Reelin or DAB1 malformations except that migration is affected at an earlier stage on the cortical plate. Cdk5/p35 pathway is also responsible for actin and microtubule dynamics involved in neuronal migration.

Cyclin-dependent kinase inhibitor 1C, or p57, also affects corticogenesis. It has been shown the p57 induces cells to exit from the cell cycle and begin differentiation, but it is dependent on Cdks. p57 is able to induce neuronal progenitor cells to start differentiating into highly specialized neurons in the cortex. However, the mechanism by which p57 is able to affect such control is not yet known.

=== Other signals ===
Besides the ones listed above, there are several more signals that affect corticogenesis. Cnr1 is a G protein-coupled receptor that is widely expressed throughout the brain and in interneurons. In knockout mice, the cortex exhibited decreased immunoreactivity. Nrp1, Robo1, and Robo2 have also been shown to be present and important in the development of interneurons. Cdh8 is known to be expressed in the intermediate and subventricular zone, though not in specific neurons in that area, and it is suggested to regulate fiber releasing.

== Disorders of cortical development ==
=== Lissencephaly ===
Lissencephaly, or 'smooth brain', is a disorder in which the brain does not properly form the gyri and sulci as a result from neuronal migration and cortical folding. This disorder can also result in epilepsy and cognitive impairment. Type 1 lissencephaly is due to an error in migration. LIS1, also known as PAFAH1B, is a gene that is expressed in both dividing and migrating cells found in the brain. When LIS1 is deleted, lissencephaly occurs.

LIS1 is thought to have several important roles in the creation of the cortex. Since LIS1 is similar to the nuclear distribution protein F (nudF), they are thought to work similarly. The nud family is known to be a factor in nuclear translocation, or moving the nuclei of daughter cells after cell division has occurred. By relation, it is thought that LIS1 is a factor in neuronal migration. LIS1 is also considered to be a factor in controlling dynein, a motor protein that affects intercellular movement such as protein sorting and the process of cell division.

Another protein that contributes to a lissencephaly disorder is DCX, or Doublecortin. DCX is a microtubule associated protein that is responsible for double cortex malformations. DCX is found in the second layer of the cortex, and in fact is still present in immature neurons of an adult cortex. It is thought that DCX affects neuronal migration through affecting the microtubule dynamics. Since DCX malformations results as a similar phenotype as with LIS1 malformations, it is thought they interact with one another on a cellular level. However, it is not yet known how this occurs.

=== Tsc1 knockout ===
TSC, or tuberous sclerosis, is an autosomal dominant disorder that results in formation of tumors along neuroectodermally-derived tissue. TSC1 or TSC2 inactivation can cause TSC and the associated tumors in the brain. When inactivation of TSC1 is present during corticogenesis, malformations of cortical tubers, or abnormal benign tissue growth, along with white matter nodes would form in mice. This replicates the effect TSC is found to have in humans afflicted with TSC. In the mice there would be a lack of GFAP in astrocytes however astrogliosis would not occur like in the human TSC.

=== Human cortex malformation (overfolding) ===
Variations within the sodium channel SCN3A, and Na+/K+,ATPase (ATP1A3), has been implicated in cortical malformations.

== Recapitulation ==
Recapitulation of corticogenesis in both human and mouse embryos has been accomplished with a three dimensional culture using embryonic stem cells (ESC). By carefully using embryo body intermediates and cultured in a serum free environment cortical progenitors form in a space and time related pattern similar to in vivo corticogenesis. Using immunocytochemical analysis on mouse neural stem cells derived from ESCs, after 6 days there was evidence of neuronal differentiation. The recapitulation ability only follows after the knowledge of spatial and temporal patterns have been identified, along with giving the knowledge that corticogenesis can occur without input from the brain.
