= Sticky mouse =

Sticky mouse is a murine possessing a gene mutation in the enzyme alanyl-tRNA synthetase (AARS). The sticky mouse, with this particular mutation, presents a good model in which to investigate mechanisms of neuronal degeneration. Its most immediately obvious symptom is a sticky secretion on the mouse's fur (thus the name); however, it is accompanied by lack of muscle control, ataxia, alopecia, loss of Purkinje cells in the cerebellum, and eventually, death.

Sticky mouse is one of several animal mutants that are known to have problems in mRNA translation and are used in studies..

A genetic mutation affecting the laminin α2 chain has been characterized in mouse models generated through targeted disruption of the Lama2 gene. These mutant mice exhibit severe muscular dystrophy, growth retardation, and early postnatal death. The absence of laminin α2 leads to progressive muscle fiber degeneration associated with increased apoptotic activity.

== See also ==
- Wasted mouse (wst) - EEF1A2 defect
- Harlequin mouse
- Reeler - RELN defect
- Shaking rat Kawasaki - RELN defect
