= Falconer's formula =

Mathematical formula used to calculate heritability in twin studies

Heritability is the proportion of variance caused by genetic factors of a specific trait in a population. Falconer's formula is a mathematical formula that is used in twin studies to estimate the relative contribution of genetic vs. environmental factors to variation in a particular trait (that is, the heritability of the trait) based on the difference between twin correlations. Statistical models for heritability commonly include an error that will absorb phenotypic variation that cannot be described by genetics when analyzed. These are unique subject-specific influences on a trait. Falconer's formula was first proposed by the Scottish geneticist Douglas Falconer.

The formula is ${H_b}^2 = 2(r_{mz} - r_{dz})$ where ${H_b}^2$ is the broad sense heritability, $r_{mz}$ is the (monozygotic, MZ) identical twin correlation, and $r_{dz}$ is the (dizygotic, DZ) fraternal twin correlation. Falconer's formula assumes the equal contribution of environmental factors in MZ pairs and DZ pairs. Therefore, additional phenotypic correlation between the two pairs is due to genetic factors. Subtracting the correlation of the DZ pairs from MZ pairs yields the variance in phenotypes contributed by genetic factors. The correlation of same sex MZ twins is always higher than the DZ twin correlation with various sexes and thus all gender differences are evaluated as heritable. To avoid this error, only genetic studies comparing MZ twins with the same sex DZ twins are valid. Correlations between $A = {H_b}^2$ (additive genetics) and $C$ (common environment) must be included in the derivation shown below.

$r_{mz} = A + C + 2 \cdot \text{Corr}(A,C)$ $r_{dz} = \frac{1}{2}A + C + 2 \cdot \text{Corr}(\tfrac{1}{2}A,C)$

== See also ==
- Quantitative genetics
