= Reeler =

Mouse mutant

A reeler mouse

A reeler is a mouse mutant, so named because of its characteristic "reeling" gait. This is caused by the profound underdevelopment of the mouse's cerebellum, a segment of the brain responsible for locomotion. The mutation is autosomal and recessive, and prevents the typical cerebellar folia from forming.

Cortical neurons are generated normally but are abnormally placed, resulting in disorganization of cortical laminar layers in the central nervous system. The reason is the lack of reelin, an extracellular matrix glycoprotein, which, during the corticogenesis, is secreted mainly by the Cajal–Retzius cells. In the reeler neocortex, cortical plate neurons are aligned in a practically inverted fashion ("outside-in"). In the ventricular zone of the cortex fewer neurons have been found to have radial glial processes. In the dentate gyrus of hippocampus, no characteristic radial glial scaffold is formed and no compact granule cell layer is established. Therefore, the reeler mouse presents a good model in which to investigate the mechanisms of establishment of the precise neuronal network during development.

== Types of reelers ==
There are two types of the reeler mutation:

- Albany2 mutation (Reln(rl-Alb2)
- Orleans mutation (Reln-rl-orl, or rl-orl), in which reelin lacks a C-terminal region and a part of the eighth reelin repeat. This hampers the secretion of the protein from the cell.

In order to unravel the reelin signaling chain, attempts are made to cut the signal downstream of reelin, leaving reelin expression intact but creating the reeler phenotype, sometimes a partial phenotype, thus confirming the role of downstream molecules. The examples include:

- Double knockout of VLDLR and ApoER2 receptors;
- Double knockout of Src and Fyn kinases.
- Cre-loxP recombination mice model that lacks Crk and CrkL in most neurons. Was used to show that Crk/CrkL lie downstream of DAB1] in the reelin signaling pathway.
- Scrambler mouse

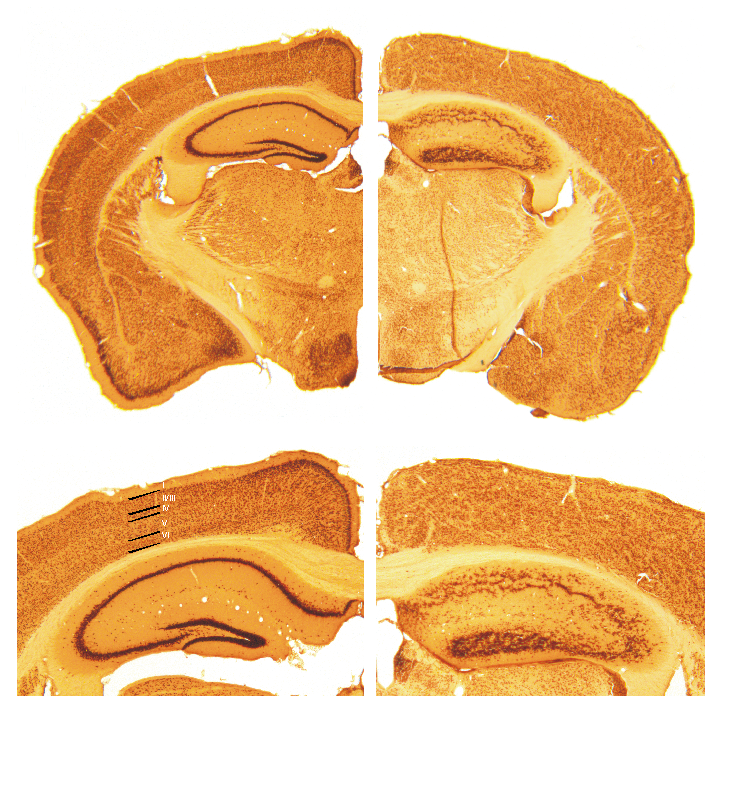
Brain slices of wildtype and reeler mice

== Key pathological findings in the reeler brain structure ==
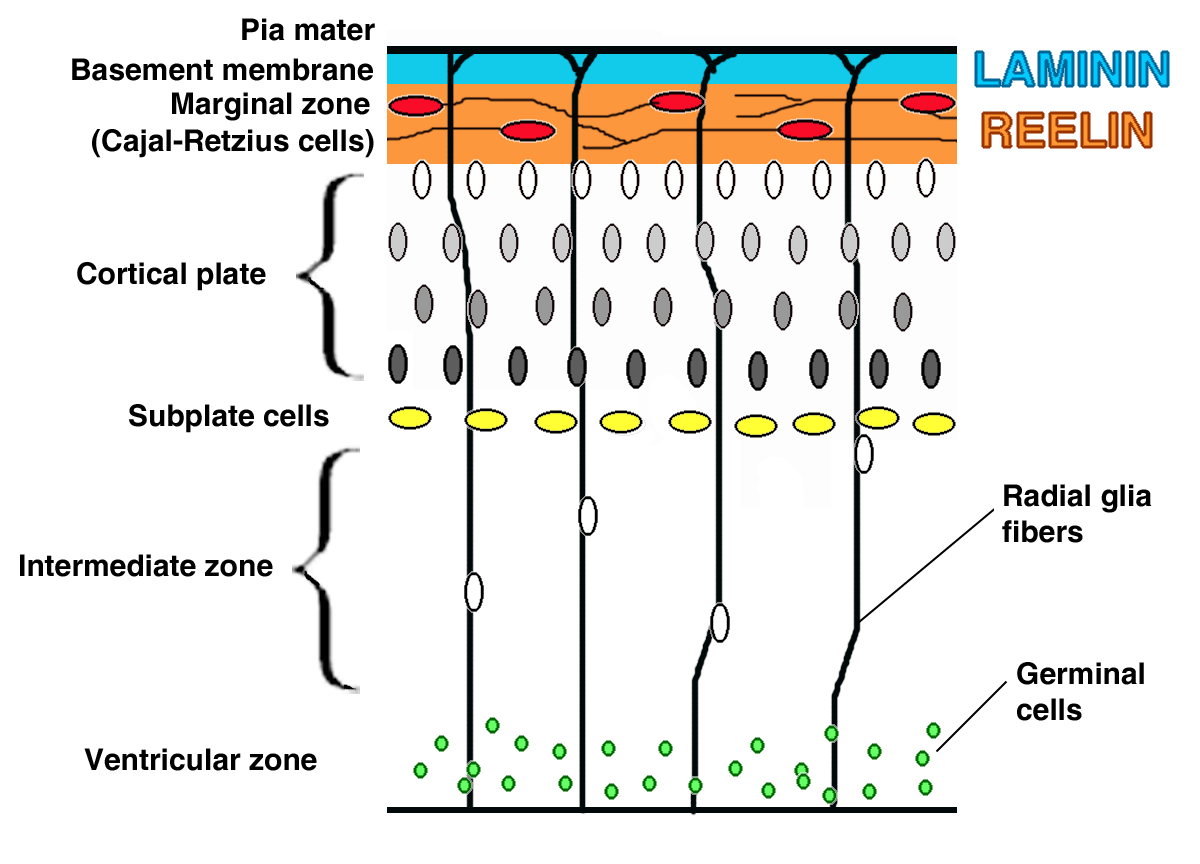
Corticogenesis in a wild-type mouse. First neurons to take their place are the subplate neurons (yellow). Next come the cortical plate neurons (black), which migrate past the subplate level. Later-generated neurons drawn to be increasingly more bright.

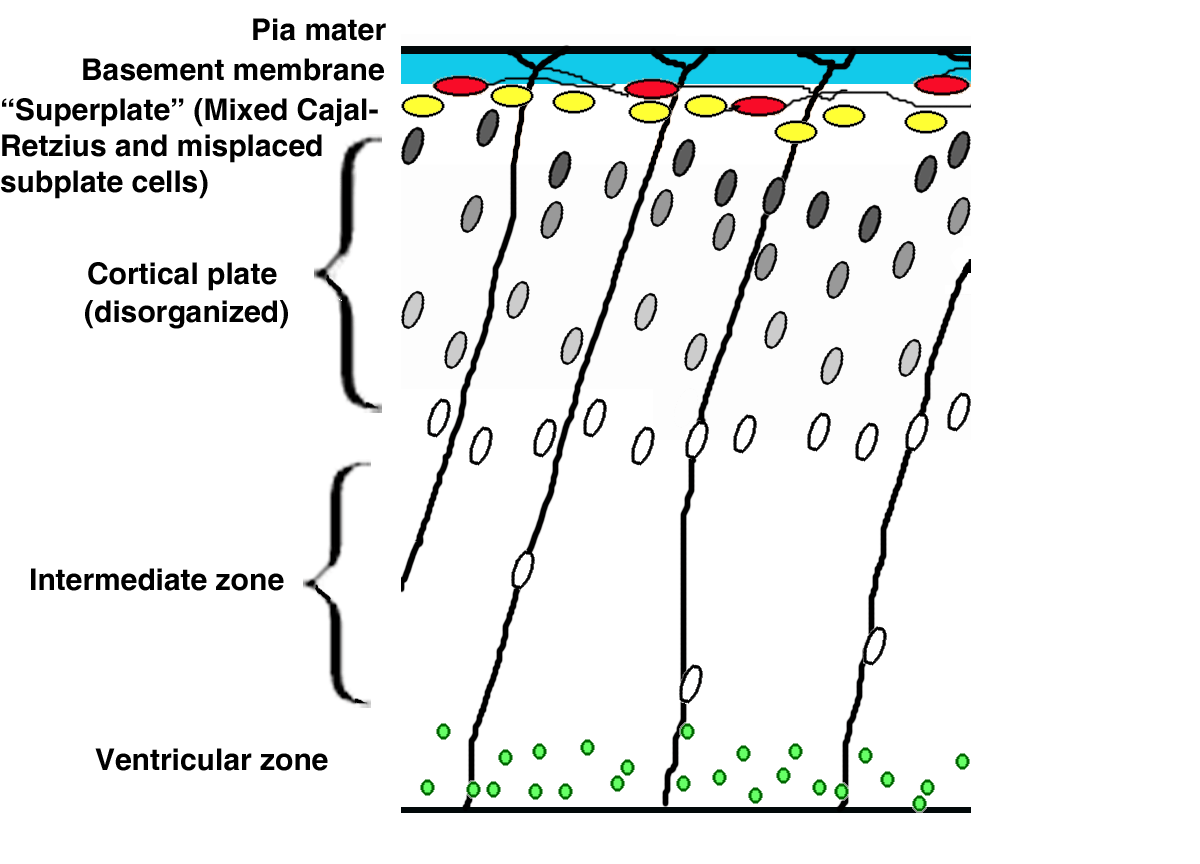
Corticogenesis in a reeler mutant mouse. Note the so-called "inverted cortex", disorganized cellular layers, oblique angles of radial glia fibers.

- Inversion of cortical layers.
  - Subplate cells become abnormally located in the subpial zone above the cortical plate. This hampers their function in establishing the transient circuits between the incoming thalamic axons and layer IV cells of the cortical plate. Thalamic axons have to grow past the cortical plate to reach the mispositioned subplate cells in the so-called superplate and then turn back down to contact their appropriate targets. This creates a curious "looping" thalamocortical connection seen in the adult reeler brain.
- Dispersion of neurons within cortical layers.
- Decreased cerebellar size.
- Failure of preplate to split
- Failure to establish a distinct granule cell layer in the dentate gyrus. Normal dentate gyrus demonstrates a clear segregation of granule cells and hilar mossy cells, which are identified, respectively, by their expression of calbindin and calretinin. In the reeler DG, the two cell types intermingle.
- Impaired dendrite outgrowth.
- In one study, reeler mice were shown to have attenuated methamphetamine-induced hyperlocomotion, which was also reduced by a targeted disruption of reelin activity in wildtype mice. Reeler mice in the same study demonstrated a decrease in D1 and D2 receptor-mediated dopaminergic function together with reduced numbers of D1\D2 receptors.

== Heterozygous reeler mouse ==
Heterozygous reeler mice, also known as HRM, while lacking the apparent phenotype seen in the homozygous reeler, also show some brain abnormalities due to the reelin deficit.

Heterozygous (rl/+) mice express reelin at 50% of wild-type levels and have grossly normal brains but exhibit a progressive loss during aging of a neuronal target of reelin action, Purkinje cells.

The mice have reduced density of parvalbumin-containing interneurons in circumscribed regions of striatum, according to one study.

Studies reveal a 16% deficit in the number of Purkinje cells in 3-month-old (+/rl) and a 24% one in 16-month-old animals: surprisingly this deficit is only present in the (+/rl) males, while the females are spared.

== History of research ==
First mention of reeler mouse mutation dates back to 1951. In the later years, histopathological studies revealed that the reeler cerebellum is dramatically decreased in size and the normal laminar organization found in several brain regions is disrupted (Hamburgh, 1960). In 1995, the RELN gene and reelin protein were discovered at chromosome 7q22 by Tom Curran and colleagues.

== Identification of the RELN ==
In 1995, the gene responsible for the reeler phenotype was identified as the RELN gene, which encodes reelin, a large secreted extracellular matrix glycoprotein primarily produced by Cajal–Retzius cells during brain development. This discovery demonstrated that the neurological abnormalities observed in reeler mice result from a defect in neuronal migration and cortical layer formation. Reelin was shown to play a crucial role in regulating the positioning of neurons by controlling their migration along radial glial fibers. In the absence of functional reelin, neurons fail to reach their proper destinations, leading to an inversion or disorganization of cortical layers, as well as abnormal cerebellar architecture. This finding provided major insights into the molecular mechanisms underlying brain development and established the reeler mouse as a key model for studying neurodevelopmental disorders.

== Clinical relevance ==
Alterations in reelin expression and signaling have been associated with several neurodevelopmental and psychiatric disorders. Reduced levels of reelin have been reported in conditions such as schizophrenia and autism spectrum disorders.

These alterations may contribute to abnormal neuronal migration and impaired synaptic plasticity, leading to deficits in brain connectivity and function. The reeler mouse is therefore widely used as an experimental model to study the molecular and cellular mechanisms underlying these disorders.

== See also ==
- Shaking rat Kawasaki has a reduced reelin expression due to missplicing of the reelin gene.
- Sticky mouse
