= Development of the nervous system =

Processes which grow and shape an organism's nervous tissue over its lifetime(s)

The construction of the nervous system is one of the most complex processes in embryology. Development of the nervous system, or neural development (neurodevelopment), refers to the processes that generate, shape, and reshape the nervous system of animals, from the earliest stages of embryonic development to adulthood. In vertebrates, it begins with the formation of the neural tube from the ectoderm via neurulation. This tube then differentiates into the brain and spinal cord through regionalization and patterning by morphogen gradients. Subsequent stages include neurogenesis (the birth of neurons) neuronal migration, axon guidance, synaptogenesis, and extensive activity-dependent refinement to produce functional neural circuits. This field of neural development draws on both neuroscience and developmental biology to describe and provide insight into the cellular and molecular mechanisms by which complex nervous systems develop, from nematodes and fruit flies to mammals.

Recent advances in genomics and imaging technologies, such as single-cell sequencing and live-cell microscopy, have refined our understanding of neural development at molecular and cellular levels. Techniques such as single-cell RNA sequencing allow researchers to profile gene expression in individual neural progenitors and neurons, revealing previously unknown cellular diversity during development. Defects in neural development can lead to malformations such as holoprosencephaly, and a wide variety of neurological disorders including limb paresis and paralysis, balance and vision disorders, and seizures, and in humans other disorders such as Rett syndrome, Down syndrome and intellectual disability.

== Vertebrate brain development ==
Diagram of the vertebrate nervous system

The vertebrate central nervous system (CNS) is derived from the ectoderm—the outermost germ layer of the embryo. A part of the dorsal ectoderm becomes specified to neural ectoderm – neuroectoderm that forms the neural plate along the dorsal side of the embryo. In humans, neural tube closure is typically complete by the end of the fourth week of gestation. Failure of closure can result in neural tube defects such as spina bifida or anencephaly. This is a part of the early patterning of the embryo (including the invertebrate embryo) that also establishes an anterior-posterior axis. The neural plate is the source of the majority of neurons and glial cells of the CNS. The neural groove forms along the long axis of the neural plate, and the neural plate folds to give rise to the neural tube. This process is known as neurulation. When the tube is closed at both ends it is filled with embryonic cerebrospinal fluid. As the embryo develops, the anterior part of the neural tube expands and forms three primary brain vesicles, which become the forebrain (prosencephalon), midbrain (mesencephalon), and hindbrain (rhombencephalon). These simple, early vesicles enlarge and further divide into the telencephalon (future cerebral cortex and basal ganglia), diencephalon (future thalamus and hypothalamus), mesencephalon (future colliculi), metencephalon (future pons and cerebellum), and myelencephalon (future medulla). The CSF-filled central chamber is continuous from the telencephalon to the central canal of the spinal cord, and constitutes the developing ventricular system of the CNS. Embryonic cerebrospinal fluid differs from that formed in later developmental stages, and from adult CSF; it influences the behavior of neural precursors. Because the neural tube gives rise to the brain and spinal cord any mutations at this stage in development can lead to fatal deformities like anencephaly or lifelong disabilities like spina bifida. During this time, the walls of the neural tube contain neural stem cells, which drive brain growth as they divide many times. Gradually some of the cells stop dividing and differentiate into neurons and glial cells, which are the main cellular components of the CNS. The newly generated neurons migrate to different parts of the developing brain to self-organize into different brain structures. Once the neurons have reached their regional positions, they extend axons and dendrites, which allow them to communicate with other neurons via synapses. Synaptic communication between neurons leads to the establishment of functional neural circuits that mediate sensory and motor processing, and underlie behavior.

Flowchart of human brain development

== Induction ==
During early embryonic development of the vertebrate, the dorsal ectoderm becomes specified to give rise to the epidermis and the nervous system; a part of the dorsal ectoderm becomes specified to neural ectoderm to form the neural plate which gives rise to the nervous system. The conversion of undifferentiated ectoderm to neuroectoderm requires signals from the mesoderm. At the onset of gastrulation presumptive mesodermal cells move through the dorsal blastopore lip and form a layer of mesoderm in between the endoderm and the ectoderm. Mesodermal cells migrate along the dorsal midline to give rise to the notochord that develops into the vertebral column. Neuroectoderm overlying the notochord develops into the neural plate in response to a diffusible signal produced by the notochord. The remainder of the ectoderm gives rise to the epidermis. The ability of the mesoderm to convert the overlying ectoderm into neural tissue is called neural induction.

In the early embryo, the neural plate folds outwards to form the neural groove. Beginning in the future neck region, the neural folds of this groove close to create the neural tube. The formation of the neural tube from the ectoderm is called neurulation. The ventral part of the neural tube is called the basal plate; the dorsal part is called the alar plate. The hollow interior is called the neural canal, and the open ends of the neural tube, called the neuropores, close off.

A transplanted blastopore lip can convert ectoderm into neural tissue and is said to have an inductive effect. Neural inducers are molecules that can induce the expression of neural genes in ectoderm explants without inducing mesodermal genes as well. Neural induction is often studied in Xenopus embryos since they have a simple body plan and there are good markers to distinguish between neural and non-neural tissue. Examples of neural inducers are the molecules noggin and chordin.

When embryonic ectodermal cells are cultured at low density in the absence of mesodermal cells they undergo neural differentiation (express neural genes), suggesting that neural differentiation is the default fate of ectodermal cells. In explant cultures (which allow direct cell-cell interactions) the same cells differentiate into epidermis. This is due to the action of BMP4 (a TGF-β family protein) that induces ectodermal cultures to differentiate into epidermis. During neural induction, noggin and chordin are produced by the dorsal mesoderm (notochord) and diffuse into the overlying ectoderm to inhibit the activity of BMP4. This inhibition of BMP4 causes the cells to differentiate into neural cells. Inhibition of TGF-β and BMP (bone morphogenetic protein) signaling can efficiently induce neural tissue from pluripotent stem cells.

== Regionalization ==
In a later stage of development the superior part of the neural tube flexes at the level of the future midbrain—the mesencephalon, at the mesencephalic flexure or cephalic flexure. Above the mesencephalon is the prosencephalon (future forebrain) and beneath it is the rhombencephalon (future hindbrain).

The alar plate of the prosencephalon expands to form the telencephalon which gives rise to the cerebral hemispheres, whilst its basal plate becomes the diencephalon. The optical vesicle (which eventually become the optic nerve, retina and iris) forms at the basal plate of the prosencephalon.

== Patterning ==
In chordates, dorsal ectoderm forms all neural tissue and the nervous system. Patterning occurs due to specific environmental conditions - different concentrations of signaling molecules

=== Dorsoventral axis ===
The ventral half of the neural plate is controlled by the notochord, which acts as the 'organiser'. The dorsal half is controlled by the ectoderm plate, which flanks either side of the neural plate.

Ectoderm follows a default pathway to become neural tissue. Evidence for this comes from single, cultured cells of ectoderm, which go on to form neural tissue. This is postulated to be because of a lack of BMPs, which are blocked by the organiser. The organiser may produce molecules such as follistatin, noggin and chordin that inhibit BMPs.

The ventral neural tube is patterned by sonic hedgehog (Shh) from the notochord, which acts as the inducing tissue. Notochord-derived Shh signals to the floor plate, and induces Shh expression in the floor plate. Floor plate-derived Shh subsequently signals to other cells in the neural tube, and is essential for proper specification of ventral neuron progenitor domains. Loss of Shh from the notochord and/or floor plate prevents proper specification of these progenitor domains. Shh binds Patched1, relieving Patched-mediated inhibition of Smoothened, leading to activation of the Gli family of transcription factors (GLI1, GLI2, and GLI3).

In this context Shh acts as a morphogen - it induces cell differentiation dependent on its concentration. At low concentrations it forms ventral interneurons, at higher concentrations it induces motor neuron development, and at highest concentrations it induces floor plate differentiation. Failure of Shh-modulated differentiation causes holoprosencephaly.

The dorsal neural tube is patterned by BMPs from the epidermal ectoderm flanking the neural plate. These induce sensory interneurons by activating Sr/Thr kinases and altering SMAD transcription factor levels.

=== Rostrocaudal (Anteroposterior) axis ===
Signals that control anteroposterior neural development include FGF and retinoic acid, which act in the hindbrain and spinal cord. The hindbrain, for example, is patterned by Hox genes, which are expressed in overlapping domains along the anteroposterior axis under the control of retinoic acid. The 3′ (3 prime end) genes in the Hox cluster are induced by retinoic acid in the hindbrain, whereas the 5′ (5 prime end) Hox genes are not induced by retinoic acid and are expressed more posteriorly in the spinal cord. Hoxb-1 is expressed in rhombomere 4 and gives rise to the facial nerve. Without this Hoxb-1 expression, a nerve similar to the trigeminal nerve arises.

== Neurogenesis ==
Neurogenesis is the process by which neurons are generated from neural stem cells and progenitor cells. Neurons are 'post-mitotic', meaning that they will never divide again for the lifetime of the organism.

Epigenetic modifications play a key role in regulating gene expression in differentiating neural stem cells and are critical for cell fate determination in the developing and adult mammalian brain. Epigenetic modifications include DNA cytosine methylation to form 5-methylcytosine and 5-methylcytosine demethylation. DNA cytosine methylation is catalyzed by DNA methyltransferases (DNMTs). Methylcytosine demethylation is catalyzed in several sequential steps by TET enzymes that carry out oxidative reactions (e.g. 5-methylcytosine to 5-hydroxymethylcytosine) and enzymes of the DNA base excision repair (BER) pathway.

A 2026 study presented evidence that the brain develops as two separate organs that come to function as one. According to this model, there are two distinct progenitor cells within the early neuroectoderm, one of which gives rise to the hindbrain, and the other gives rise to the forebrain and midbrain. This developmental pattern appears to have arisen in the hemichordates and continued through evolution into humans.

== Neuronal migration ==
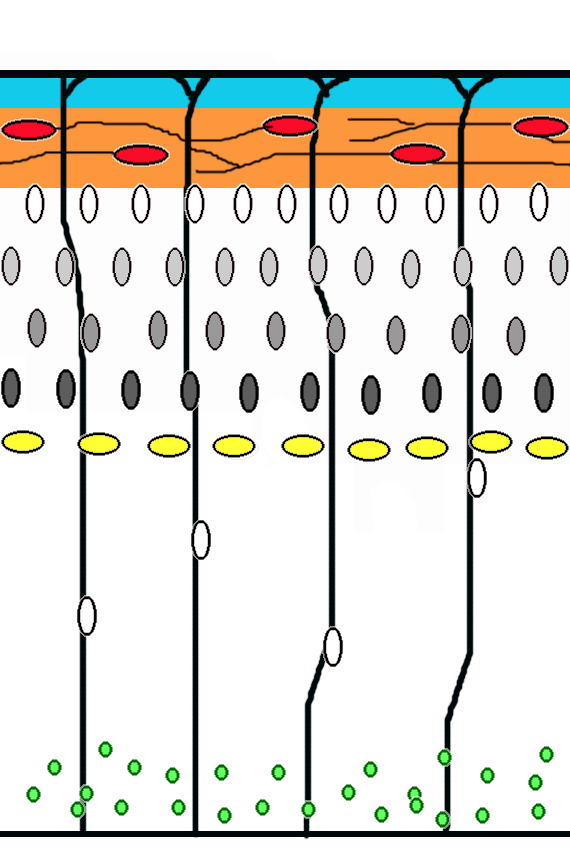
Corticogenesis: younger neurons migrate past older ones using radial glia as a scaffolding. Cajal–Retzius cells (red) release reelin (orange).

Neuronal migration is the method by which neurons travel from their origin or birthplace to their final position in the brain. There are several ways they can do this, e.g. by radial migration or tangential migration. Sequences of radial migration (also known as glial guidance) and somal translocation have been captured by time-lapse microscopy.

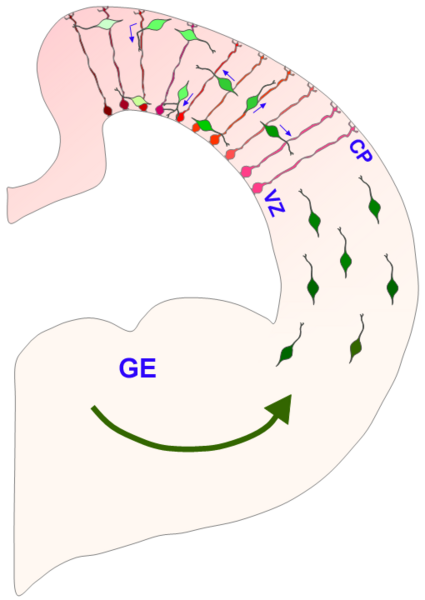
Tangential migration of interneurons from ganglionic eminence

=== Radial ===
Neuronal precursor cells proliferate in the ventricular zone of the developing neocortex, where the principal neural stem cell is the radial glial cell. The first postmitotic cells must leave the stem cell niche and migrate outward to form the preplate, which is destined to become Cajal–Retzius cells and subplate neurons. These cells do so by somal translocation. Neurons migrating with this mode of locomotion are bipolar and attach the leading edge of the process to the pia. The soma is then transported to the pial surface by nucleokinesis, a process by which a microtubule "cage" around the nucleus elongates and contracts in association with the centrosome to guide the nucleus to its final destination.

Radial glial cells, whose fibers serve as a scaffolding for migrating cells and a means of radial communication mediated by calcium dynamic activity, act as the main excitatory neuronal stem cell of the cerebral cortex or translocate to the cortical plate and differentiate either into astrocytes or neurons. Somal translocation can occur at any time during development.

Subsequent waves of neurons split the preplate by migrating along radial glial fibres to form the cortical plate. Each wave of migrating cells travel past their predecessors forming layers in an inside-out manner, meaning that the youngest neurons are the closest to the surface. It is estimated that glial guided migration represents 90% of migrating neurons in human and about 75% in rodents.

=== Tangential ===
Most interneurons migrate tangentially through multiple modes of migration to reach their appropriate location in the cortex. An example of tangential migration is the movement of interneurons from the ganglionic eminence to the cerebral cortex. One example of ongoing tangential migration in a mature organism, observed in some animals, is the rostral migratory stream connecting subventricular zone and olfactory bulb.

=== Axophilic ===
Many neurons migrating along the anterior-posterior axis of the body use existing axon tracts to migrate along; this is called axophilic migration. An example of this mode of migration is in GnRH-expressing neurons, which make a long journey from their birthplace in the nose, through the forebrain, and into the hypothalamus. Many of the mechanisms of this migration have been worked out, starting with the extracellular guidance cues that trigger intracellular signaling. These intracellular signals, such as calcium signaling, lead to actin and microtubule cytoskeletal dynamics, which produce cellular forces that interact with the extracellular environment through cell adhesion proteins to cause the movement of these cells.

=== Multipolar ===
There is also a method of neuronal migration called multipolar migration. This is seen in multipolar cells, which in the human, are abundantly present in the cortical intermediate zone. They do not resemble the cells migrating by locomotion or somal translocation. Instead these multipolar cells express neuronal markers and extend multiple thin processes in various directions independently of the radial glial fibers.

== Neurotrophic factors ==
The survival of neurons is regulated by survival factors, called trophic factors. The neurotrophic hypothesis was formulated by Victor Hamburger and Rita Levi Montalcini based on studies of the developing nervous system. Victor Hamburger discovered that implanting an extra limb in the developing chick led to an increase in the number of spinal motor neurons. Initially he thought that the extra limb was inducing proliferation of motor neurons, but he and his colleagues later showed that there was a great deal of motor neuron death during normal development, and the extra limb prevented this cell death. According to the neurotrophic hypothesis, growing axons compete for limiting amounts of target-derived trophic factors and axons that fail to receive sufficient trophic support die by apoptosis. It is now clear that factors produced by a number of sources contribute to neuronal survival.

- Nerve Growth Factor (NGF): Rita Levi Montalcini and Stanley Cohen purified the first trophic factor, Nerve Growth Factor (NGF), for which they received the Nobel Prize. There are three NGF-related trophic factors: BDNF, NT3, and NT4, which regulate survival of various neuronal populations. The Trk proteins act as receptors for NGF and related factors. Trk is a receptor tyrosine kinase. Trk dimerization and phosphorylation leads to activation of various intracellular signaling pathways including the MAP kinase, Akt, and PKC pathways.
- CNTF: Ciliary neurotrophic factor is another protein that acts as a survival factor for motor neurons. CNTF acts via a receptor complex that includes CNTFRα, GP130, and LIFRβ. Activation of the receptor leads to phosphorylation and recruitment of the JAK kinase, which in turn phosphorylates LIFRβ. LIFRβ acts as a docking site for the STAT transcription factors. JAK kinase phosphorylates STAT proteins, which dissociate from the receptor and translocate to the nucleus to regulate gene expression.
- GDNF: Glial derived neurotrophic factor is a member of the TGFb family of proteins, and is a potent trophic factor for striatal neurons. The functional receptor is a heterodimer, composed of type 1 and type 2 receptors. Activation of the type 1 receptor leads to phosphorylation of Smad proteins, which translocate to the nucleus to activate gene expression.

== Synapse formation ==
=== Neuromuscular junction ===
Much of our understanding of synapse formation comes from studies at the neuromuscular junction. The transmitter at this synapse is acetylcholine. The acetylcholine receptor (AChR) is present at the surface of muscle cells before synapse formation. The arrival of the nerve induces clustering of the receptors at the synapse. McMahan and Sanes showed that the synaptogenic signal is concentrated at the basal lamina. They also showed that the synaptogenic signal is produced by the nerve, and they identified the factor as Agrin. Agrin induces clustering of AChRs on the muscle surface and synapse formation is disrupted in agrin knockout mice. Agrin transduces the signal via MuSK receptor to rapsyn. Fischbach and colleagues showed that receptor subunits are selectively transcribed from nuclei next to the synaptic site. This is mediated by neuregulins.

In the mature synapse each muscle fiber is innervated by one motor neuron. However, during development, many of the fibers are innervated by multiple axons. Lichtman and colleagues have studied the process of synapses elimination. This is an activity-dependent event. Partial blockage of the receptor leads to retraction of corresponding presynaptic terminals. Later they used a connectomic approach, i.e., tracing out all the connections between motor neurons and muscle fibers, to characterize developmental synapse elimination on the level of a full circuit. Analysis confirmed the massive rewiring, 10-fold decrease in the number of synapses, that takes place as axons prune their motor units but add more synaptic areas at the NMJs with which they remain in contact.

=== CNS synapses ===
Agrin appears not to be a central mediator of CNS synapse formation and there is active interest in identifying signals that mediate CNS synaptogenesis. Neurons in culture develop synapses that are similar to those that form in vivo, suggesting that synaptogenic signals can function properly in vitro. CNS synaptogenesis studies have focused mainly on glutamatergic synapses. Imaging experiments show that dendrites are highly dynamic during development and often initiate contact with axons. This is followed by recruitment of postsynaptic proteins to the site of contact. Stephen Smith and colleagues have shown that contact initiated by dendritic filopodia can develop into synapses.

Induction of synapse formation by glial factors: Barres and colleagues made the observation that factors in glial conditioned media induce synapse formation in retinal ganglion cell cultures. Synapse formation in the CNS is correlated with astrocyte differentiation suggesting that astrocytes might provide a synaptogenic factor. The identity of the astrocytic factors is not yet known.

Neuroligins and SynCAM as synaptogenic signals: Sudhof, Serafini, Scheiffele and colleagues have shown that neuroligins and SynCAM can act as factors that induce presynaptic differentiation. Neuroligins are concentrated at the postsynaptic site and act via neurexins concentrated in the presynaptic axons. SynCAM is a cell adhesion molecule that is present in both pre- and post-synaptic membranes.

=== Assembly of neural circuits ===
The processes of neuronal migration, differentiation and axon guidance are generally believed to be activity-independent mechanisms and rely on hard-wired genetic programs in the neurons themselves. Research findings however have implicated a role for activity-dependent mechanisms in mediating some aspects of these processes such as the rate of neuronal migration, aspects of neuronal differentiation and axon pathfinding. These three processes are directed by molecular cues that act as guidance forces for growing axons - Chemoattraction (through the use of Netrins), Chemorepulsion ( through the use of secreted Semaphorins), Contact attraction (Cadherins) and Contact repulsion (Semaphorins). Activity-dependent mechanisms influence neural circuit development and are crucial for laying out early connectivity maps and the continued refinement of synapses which occurs during development. There are two distinct types of neural activity we observe in developing circuits - early spontaneous activity and sensory-evoked activity. Spontaneous activity occurs early during neural circuit development even when sensory input is absent and is observed in many systems such as the developing visual system, auditory system, motor system, hippocampus, cerebellum and neocortex.

Experimental techniques such as direct electrophysiological recording, fluorescence imaging using calcium indicators and optogenetic techniques have shed light on the nature and function of these early bursts of activity. They have distinct spatial and temporal patterns during development and their ablation during development has been known to result in deficits in network refinement in the visual system. In the immature retina, waves of spontaneous action potentials arise from the retinal ganglion cells and sweep across the retinal surface in the first few postnatal weeks. These waves are mediated by neurotransmitter acetylcholine in the initial phase and later on by glutamate. They are thought to instruct the formation of two sensory maps- the retinotopic map and eye-specific segregation. Retinotopic map refinement occurs in downstream visual targets in the brain-the superior colliculus (SC) and dorsal lateral geniculate nucleus (LGN). Pharmacological disruption and mouse models lacking the β2 subunit of the nicotinic acetylcholine receptor has shown that the lack of spontaneous activity leads to marked defects in retinotopy and eye-specific segregation.

Recent studies confirm that microglia, the resident immune cell of the brain, establish direct contacts with the cell bodies of developing neurons, and through these connections, regulate neurogenesis, migration, integration and the formation of neuronal networks in an activity-dependent manner.

In the developing auditory system, developing cochlea generate bursts of activity which spreads across the inner hair cells and spiral ganglion neurons which relay auditory information to the brain. ATP release from supporting cells triggers action potentials in inner hair cells. In the auditory system, spontaneous activity is thought to be involved in tonotopic map formation by segregating cochlear neuron axons tuned to high and low frequencies. In the motor system, periodic bursts of spontaneous activity are driven by excitatory GABA and glutamate during the early stages and by acetylcholine and glutamate at later stages. In the developing zebrafish spinal cord, early spontaneous activity is required for the formation of increasingly synchronous alternating bursts between ipsilateral and contralateral regions of the spinal cord and for the integration of new cells into the circuit. Motor neurons innervating the same twitch muscle fibers are thought to maintain synchronous activity which allows both neurons to remain in contact with the muscle fiber in adulthood. In the cortex, early waves of activity have been observed in the cerebellum and cortical slices. Once sensory stimulus becomes available, final fine-tuning of sensory-coding maps and circuit refinement begins to rely more and more on sensory-evoked activity as demonstrated by classic experiments about the effects of sensory deprivation during critical periods.

Contemporary diffusion-weighted MRI techniques may also uncover the macroscopic process of axonal development. The connectome can be constructed from diffusion MRI data: the vertices of the graph correspond to anatomically labelled gray matter areas, and two such vertices, say u and v, are connected by an edge if the tractography phase of the data processing finds an axonal fiber that connects the two areas, corresponding to u and v.

Consensus Connectome Dynamics

Numerous braingraphs, computed from the Human Connectome Project can be downloaded from the http://braingraph.org site. The Consensus Connectome Dynamics (CCD) is a remarkable phenomenon that was discovered by continuously decreasing the minimum confidence-parameter at the graphical interface of the Budapest Reference Connectome Server. The Budapest Reference Connectome Server (http://connectome.pitgroup.org) depicts the cerebral connections of n=418 subjects with a frequency-parameter k: For any k=1,2,...,n one can view the graph of the edges that are present in at least k connectomes. If parameter k is decreased one-by-one from k=n through k=1 then more and more edges appear in the graph, since the inclusion condition is relaxed. The surprising observation is that the appearance of the edges is far from random: it resembles a growing, complex structure, like a tree or a shrub (visualized on the animation on the left).

It is hypothesized in that the growing structure copies the axonal development of the human brain: the earliest developing connections (axonal fibers) are common at most of the subjects, and the subsequently developing connections have larger and larger variance, because their variances are accumulated in the process of axonal development.

== Synapse elimination ==
Synapse elimination is one of the most crucial part of refining the developing neural circuits during embryonic development. Initially, the nervous system creates an excess of neuron connections to ensure that all target cells are contacted. This mainly happens in the developing vertebrate nervous system. The reason why this happens is to make sure all the cells in the target population are innervated. Several motor neurons then compete for each neuromuscular junction, but only one survives until adulthood. Competition in vitro has been shown to involve a limited neurotrophic substance that is released, or that neural activity infers advantage to strong post-synaptic connections by giving resistance to a toxin also released upon nerve stimulation. In vivo, it is suggested that muscle fibres select the strongest neuron through a retrograde signal or that activity-dependent synapse elimination mechanisms determine the identity of the "winning" axon at a motor endplate. The winning axon is a representation of the 'pruning' process of the weaker and less active synapses to increase efficiency.

== Mapping ==
Brain mapping can show how an animal's brain changes throughout its lifetime. As of 2021, scientists mapped and compared the whole brains (head ganglia) of eight C. elegans worms across their development on the neuronal level and the complete wiring of a single mammalian muscle from birth to adulthood.

== Adult neurogenesis ==
Neurogenesis also occurs to generate functional neurons in adults. This occurs in specific parts of the adult brain such as the dentate gyrus of the hippocampus. Adult neurogenesis was first found in models of rats by Altman and Das, as it was only known to be present in embryonic development.

== See also ==
- Axon guidance
- KCC2
- Pioneer neuron
- Neural Darwinism
- Brain development timelines
- Malleable intelligence
- Role of cell adhesions in neural development
