= Subplate =

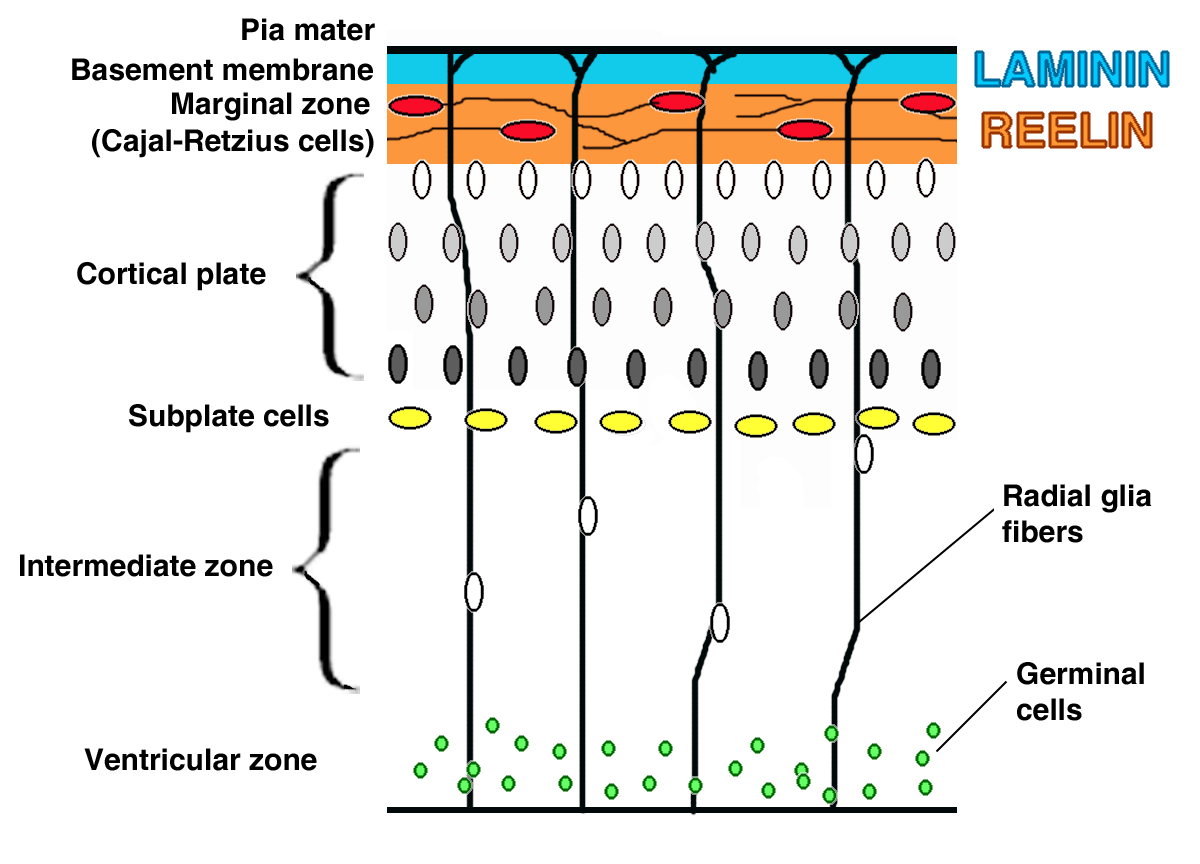
Corticogenesis in a mouse brain. Subplate neurons are coloured yellow.

The subplate, also called the subplate zone, together with the marginal zone and the cortical plate, in the fetus represents the developmental anlage of the mammalian cerebral cortex. It was first described, as a separate transient fetal zone by Ivica Kostović and Mark E. Molliver in 1974.

During the midfetal period of fetal development the subplate zone is the largest zone in the developing telencephalon. It serves as a waiting compartment for growing cortical afferents; its cells are involved in the establishment of pioneering cortical efferent projections and transient fetal circuitry, and apparently have a number of other developmental roles. The subplate zone is a phylogenetically recent structure and it is most developed in the human brain.

Subplate neurons (SPNs) are among the first generated neurons in the mammalian cerebral cortex. These neurons disappear during postnatal development and are important in establishing the correct wiring and functional maturation of the cerebral cortex. Subplate neurons appear to be selectively sensitive to injury (such as hypoxia) which in humans are associated with motor and cognitive defects.

Subplate neurons are the first cortical neurons to receive synaptic inputs from thalamic axons, establishing a temporary link between thalamic axons and their final target in layer IV.Later, thalamic axons invade layer IV where they innervate layer IV neurons. In the visual system thalamic axons to layer IV form ocular dominance columns and this segregation of thalamic axons is impaired if subplate neurons are missing.

== See also ==
- Cerebral Cortex
- Cortical column
- Cerebral hemisphere
- Ghosh A, Shatz CJ (March 1992). "Involvement of subplate neurons in the formation of ocular dominance columns". Science. 255 (5050): 1441–3. doi:10.1126/science.1542795. PMID 1542795.
- Friauf E, McConnell SK, Shatz CJ (August 1990). "Functional synaptic circuits in the subplate during fetal and early postnatal development of cat visual cortex". J. Neurosci. 10 (8): 2601–13. doi:10.1523/JNEUROSCI.10-08-02601.1990. PMC 6570284. PMID 2388080.
- Rakic P (April 1977). "Prenatal development of the visual system in rhesus monkey". Philos. Trans. R. Soc. Lond. B Biol. Sci. 278 (961): 245–60. doi:10.1098/rstb.1977.0040. PMID 19781.
- Kostovic I, Rakic P (April 1980). "Cytology and time of origin of interstitial neurons in the white matter in infant and adult human and monkey telencephalon". J. Neurocytol. 9 (2): 219–42. doi:10.1007/BF01205159. PMID 7441294.
- McConnell SK, Ghosh A, Shatz CJ (September 1989). "Subplate neurons pioneer the first axon pathway from the cerebral cortex". Science. 245 (4921): 978–82. doi:10.1126/science.2475909. PMID 2475909.
- Kanold PO, Kara P, Reid RC, Shatz CJ (July 2003). "Role of subplate neurons in functional maturation of visual cortical columns". Science. 301 (5632): 521–5. doi:10.1126/science.1084152. PMID 12881571.
- McQuillen PS, Ferriero DM (July 2005). "Perinatal subplate neuron injury: implications for cortical development and plasticity". Brain Pathol. 15 (3): 250–60. doi:10.1111/j.1750-3639.2005.tb00528.x. PMC 8096042. PMID 16196392.
