= Cajal–Retzius cell =

Cell that guides radial neuronal migration

Cajal-Retzius cell
- Cajal–Retzius cells as drawn by Santiago Ramón y Cajal in 1891

Identifiers
- NeuroLex ID: nlx_cell_20081206

Cajal–Retzius cells (CR cells) (also known as horizontal cells of Cajal) are a heterogeneous population of morphologically and molecularly distinct reelin-producing cells. They are found in the marginal zone/layer I of the developing cerebral cortex and in the immature hippocampus of different species and at different times during embryogenesis and postnatal life.

These cells were discovered by two scientists, Santiago Ramón y Cajal and Gustaf Retzius, at two different times and in different species. They are originated in the developing brain in multiple sites within the neocortex and hippocampus. From there, Cajal–Retzius cells migrate through the marginal zone, originating the layer I of the cortex.

CR cells are involved in the correct organization of the developing brain, and there are several studies that implicate them in neurodevelopmental disorders, including schizophrenia, bipolar disorder, autism, lissencephaly and temporal lobe epilepsy.

== Development ==
In 1971, it was described that it was very difficult to find a CR cell in the adult cortex, because of the constant number of these cells and the fact that as the brain grows, the distance between these cells increases, required the observation of a great number of preparations to find one of these cells. In mice, CR cells are generated very early in the development, appearing between 10.5 and 12.5 embryonic days.

Cajal–Retzius cells were described to migrate tangentially in the marginal zone, a superficial layer of the preplate in the cortical neuroepithelium, According to some studies, this migration depends on the site where the cell was generated, showing a link between the origin, the migration and the destination of the cell.

Studies have shown that Cajal–Retzius cells have different origins, both in the neocortex and in the hippocampus. In the neocortex they originate in the local pallium ventricular zone, the pallial-subpallial border of the ventral pallium, a region at the septum, the cortical hem and the retrobulbar ventricular zone.

In 2006, it was demonstrated that in mouse cells, the meninges control the migration of the CR cells in the cortical hem. Subpopulations of these neurons from the septum and pallial-subpallial border express the homeodomain transcription factor Dbx1 and migrate to the medial, dorsolateral and piriform cortex and though genetically different from the other subpopulations (Dbx1 negative), all have the same morphological and electrophysiological properties, despite the different origins of CR cells.

== Function ==
Cajal–Retzius cells are involved in the organization of the developing brain. In 1998, immature neurons from the pyramidal neocortex and other regions of the immature brain showed membrane depolarizations of CR cells caused by GABA-A and glycine receptor activation. In 1994, a subpopulation of CR cells was shown to be GABAergic (using GABA as a transmitter).

In 2003, CR cells in rodents and primates were shown to be glutamatergic (using glutamate as a transmitter). Immunohistochemical studies (detecting antigens by exploiting the principle of antibodies binding specifically to antigens in biological tissues) showed that CR cells expressed GABA-A and GABA-B receptors, ionotropic and metabotropic glutamate receptors, vesicular glutamate transporters, and a number of different calcium-binding proteins, such as calbindin, calretinin and parvalbumin. CR cells express several genes important in corticogenesis, such as reelin (RELN), LIS1, EMX2, and DS-CAM. CR cells selectively express p73, a member of the p53 family involved in cell death and survival.

CR cells receive an early serotonergic input, which in mice forms synaptic contacts.

In 2001, CR cells in the marginal zone were found to have electrophysiological fingerprints. Whole-cell patch-clamp studies (the laboratory technique in electrophysiology allowing the study of single or multiple ion channels in cells) showed that CRN injected by a suprathreshold depolarizing current pulse express a repetitive firing mode and cells injected by a hyperpolarizing current pulse, express a hyperpolarization-activated inward current (H-current).

Using chloride-containing patch-clamp electrodes in 2006, spontaneous postsynaptic currents (PSCs) were recorded in about 30% of the CR cells in P0-P2 rat cerebral cortex. These spontaneous postsynaptic currents decreased to about 10% at P4, indicating that CR cells became functionally disconnected during further development. these spontaneous postsynaptic currents were reversibly blocked by bicuculline, a light-sensitive competitive antagonist of GABA-A receptors, suggesting activation of GABA-A receptors in these spontaneous postsynaptic currents. Moreover, the frequency and amplitude of these spontaneous postsynaptic currents was not influenced by tetrodotoxin, which inhibits the firing of action potentials in nerves, indicating that these spontaneous postsynaptic currents are independent of presynaptic action potentials.

=== Brain development ===
CR cells secrete the extracellular matrix protein reelin, which is critically involved in the control of radial neuronal migration through a signaling pathway, including the very low density lipoprotein receptor (VLDLR), the apolipoprotein E receptor type 2 (ApoER2), and the cytoplasmic adapter protein disabled 1 (Dab1). In early cortical development in mice, mutations of Dab1, VLDLR, and ApoER2, generate similar abnormal phenotypes, called reeler-like phenotype. It performs several abnormal processes in brain development, such as forming an outside to inside gradient, forming cells in an oblique orientation. Therefore, CR cells control two processes: detachment from radial glia and somal translocation in the formation of cortical layers. In addition, the reeler type also manifests a poor organization of the Purkinje cell plate(PP) and the inferior olivary complex(IOC).

== Clinical significance ==
Problems in migration, especially those that arise from the lack of reelin production, may influence brain development and lead to disorders in brain's normal functioning.

In the 1950s, the reeler mutant mouse was described by Falconer as a naturally occurring mutant. It exhibits some behavioral abnormalities, such as ataxia, tremor and hypotonia, which were discovered to be related to problems in neuronal migration and consequently, cytoarchitecture in the cerebellum, hippocampus and cerebral cortex.

It was found later that the mutation causing these disorders was located in the RELN gene which codes for reelin, a glycoprotein secreted by Cajal–Retzius cells in the developing brain. This protein seems to act as a stop signal for migrating neurons, controlling the positioning and orientation of neurons in their layers, according to the inside-out pattern of development. When the mutation occurs, reelin expression is reduced and this signal isn't as strong, therefore, migration of the first neurons in the brain is not done correctly. The reeler mutant has been used, because of its characteristics, as a model for the study of neuropsychiatric disorders.

- In brains from people with Alzheimer's disease the number of Cajal–Retzius cells (which is highly reduced after maturation and in adult life), is even further diminished in comparison to normal brains; their morphology is also altered, namely there is a significant reduction of their dendritic arborization, which reduces the number of synapses between these cells and other neurons. As Cajal–Retzius cells are important to the laminar patterning of the brain, their loss may be related to the progressive disruption of the microcolumnar ensembles of the association cortex, which may explain some symptoms of this disease.
- Schizophrenia is thought to be of neurodevelopmental origin, that is, there are events in our developing brain between the first and second trimester of gestation which may condition the activation of the pathological neural circuits leading to its symptoms later in life. It has been hypothesised that abnormal brain lamination is one of the possible causes of schizophrenia.
- It has been shown that in the brains of patients with schizophrenia, as well as in those of patients with bipolar disorder, the glycoprotein reelin is 50% downregulated. In the brains of patients with autism, structural abnormalities in the neocortex and diminished levels of reelin suggest the involvement of CR cells in this disorder.
- Lissencephaly results from defective neuronal migration between the first and second trimester of gestation which causes lack of gyral and sulcal development, as well as improper lamination, giving the brain a smooth appearance. As of 2003, there were five genes related to lissencephaly, including LIS1, the first to be discovered, and RELN. Apparently Cajal–Retzius cells are not affected in mutations in the LIS1 gene, even though the product of this gene interferes with reelin interaction with their receptors. Mutations in the RELN gene appear in the autosomal form of lissencephaly with cerebral hypoplasia, where patients show developmental delay, hypotonia, ataxia and seizures, symptoms which can be related to the reeler mutant.
- Temporal lobe epilepsy is characterized by a high number of Cajal–Retzius cells in adult life, which supposedly causes continuous neurogenesis and migration, thus causing the seizures that characterize this disorder.

== History ==
In 1891, Santiago Ramón y Cajal described slender horizontal bipolar cells he had found in an histological preparation of the developing marginal zone of lagomorphs. These cells were then considered by Gustaf Retzius as homologous to the ones he had found in the marginal zone of human fetuses around mid-gestation in 1893 and 1894. He described those cells as having large, horizontal, sometimes vertically orientated somata located at some distance from the pia.

Later on in 1899, Cajal drew the neurons in layer I of the human fetus at term and newborn. The cells laid closer to the pia and displayed smaller, often triangular or pyriform somata, and less complex processes that lacked the ascending branchlets and had a more superficial location than the cells Retzius previously described. The cells' different morphologies and the fact that Cajal and Retzius used different species at different developmental periods led to discussion about the definition of Cajal–Retzius cells. In fact, immunohistochemical studies performed at advanced developmental stages in human and macaque cortex visualize cells more similar to the cells Cajal described.

In contrast, studies from 1994 of the human mid-gestation period describe cells closer to the Retzius type.

The early descriptions by Cajal and Retzius referred to the neocortex, but since 1994 similar cells have been found in the marginal zone of the hippocampus.

Various studies then proved the Cajal–Retzius cells as being responsible for the production of reelin.

In 1999, Meyer loosely defined the Cajal–Retzius cells as the family of Reln-immunoreactive neurons in the marginal zone of the hippocampus, as so to settle a difference between the pioneer neurons, Reln-negative preplate derivatives that settle in the same area and project to the subcortical area that he had already described in 1998. He also described simpler cells with simpler morphologies in the marginal zone of rodents.

In 2005, the discovery of heterogeneous transcription factors and new sites of origin suggested that there were distinct subpopulations of Cajal–Retzius cells in different territories of the developing cortex.

As of 2017, a clear classification scheme has not been established.

== See also ==
- List of distinct cell types in the adult human body
