= Pointon (surname) =

Pointon is an English surname. Notable people with the surname include:

- Barbara Pointon (1939-2020), English composer and activist
- Bill Pointon (1920–2008), English footballer
- Joe Pointon (1905–1939), English footballer
- Malcolm Pointon (died 2007), English pianist and Alzheimer's sufferer
- Marcia Pointon, British art historian
- Neil Pointon (born 1964), English footballer
- Ray Pointon (1947–2013), English footballer
- Rob Pointon (born 1982), English painter
- Tom Pointon (1890 – after 1924), English footballer
