= Teofil Simchowicz =

Polish neurologist (1879–1957)

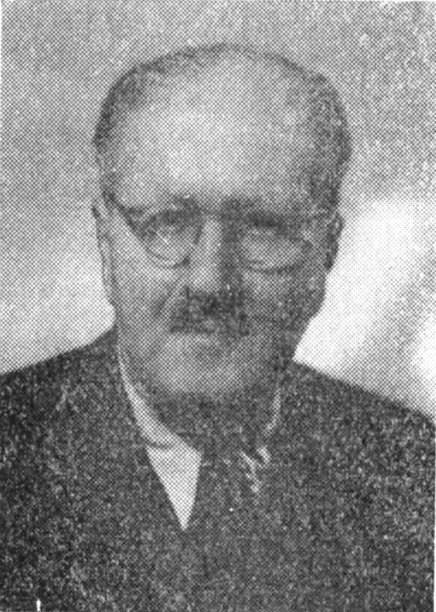
Teofil Simchowicz

Teofil Simchowicz (3 June 1879 – 31 December 1957) was a Polish neurologist who was born in Ciechanowiec, in the Grodno Governorate of the Russian Empire (now Poland). He studied medicine at the Imperial University of Warsaw, and received a medical degree in 1905. In years 1907-1910 he worked in Munich under Alois Alzheimer, studying neuropathological changes in dementia. During World War II he emigrated to Palestine.

He discovered granulovacuolar degeneration (of Simchowicz), observed in hippocampal pyramidal cells in Alzheimer's disease.

== Bibliography ==
- Polski Słownik Biograficzny Tom XXXVII Warszawa-Kraków 1996–1997, s. 505-506 ISBN 83-86301-01-5.
- A. Ohry, O. Buda. Teofil Simchowicz (1879-1957): the scientist who coined senile plaques in neuropathology. „Romanian Journal of Morphology and Embryology”. 56 (4), s. 1545–1548, 2015.
