= David Ames (researcher) =

Australian psychiatrist and academic

David John Ames AO FRCPsych FRANZCP
- Born: 1954 (age 71–72)
- Citizenship: Australian
- Education: University of Melbourne; Royal Free Hospital
- Known for: Dementia and the mental health of older persons
- Scientific career
- Fields: Psychiatry
- Workplaces: Royal Melbourne Hospital; Royal Free Hospital; Friern Hospital; University of Melbourne; CSIRO – Australian Imaging Biomarkers & Lifestyle Study
- Thesis: Depression in residential homes for the elderly (1987)
- Doctoral advisor: Anthony Mann Nori Graham
- Website: findanexpert.unimelb.edu.au/display/person13570

David John Ames AO (born 1954) is an Australian psychiatrist and academic. In addition to being Emeritus Professor in the Department of Psychiatry at the University of Melbourne, he is a part-time consultant psychiatrist at a number of hospitals in Melbourne, a professorial fellow with The National Ageing Research Institute and a research fellow at the Howard Florey Institute. Over his career, Ames has written over 56 book chapters, edited 22 books, and has published over 300 articles in peer-reviewed journals. Ames' main research and clinical interests have been the detection and management of Alzheimer's disease (AD), new therapies for AD, and the care of the depressed elderly.

In 2018, Ames was made an Officer of the General Division of the Order of Australia (AO) in the 2018 Australia Day Honours, for distinguished service to psychiatry, particularly in the area of dementia and the mental health of older persons, as an academic, author and practitioner, and as an adviser to professional bodies.

== Education ==
Ames graduated with honours in Medicine and Obstetrics & Gynaecology (MBBS) in 1978 from the University of Melbourne, where he was awarded the Upjohn prize for Clinical Pharmacology and Therapeutics.

After completing his internship and junior resident medical officer experience at the Royal Melbourne Hospital between 1979–1981, Ames trained in psychiatry at the Royal Melbourne Hospital. Moving to London in 1984 he continued his training in psychiatry at the Friern Hospital. In 1985 Ames was appointed to a position as an honorary lecturer and research fellow at the Royal Free Hospital.

After returning to Melbourne, Ames continued his educational pursuits at the University of Melbourne. In 1989 he then completed his doctoral thesis on "depression in residential homes for the elderly" obtaining his Doctor of Medicine (MD) in 1987. In 1993 he also completed a part-time Bachelor of Arts (BA) with a major in (Medieval) history.

== Works ==
=== AIBL study ===
Australian Imaging, Biomarkers and Lifestyle Study of Ageing, started in 2006, is a study of over 1,100 people assessed over a long period of time ( > 4.5 years) to determine which biomarkers, cognitive characteristics, and health and lifestyle factors determine subsequent development of symptomatic Alzheimer's Disease. With Australia's ageing population, the number of people suffering from dementia is expected to rise from 245,400 (1.1% of population) in 2009 to 1.13 million (3.2% of projected population) by 2050. It is one of the fastest growing sources of major disease burden, overtaking coronary heart disease in total well being cost by 2023.

=== Selected books authored and edited ===
- Chiu, Edmond; Ames, David, eds. (1994). Functional psychiatric disorders of the elderly. Cambridge: Cambridge University Press. ISBN 0521431603. OCLC 726828035.
- McKenzie, Kwame (2000). Ames, David; Arnold, Peter (eds.). The Australian Medical Association home medical guide to depression. St Leonards, N.S.W.: St Leonards, N.S.W. : Dorling Kindersley. ISBN 1740331060. OCLC 154566869.
- Hassett, Anne; Ames, David; Chiu, Edmond, eds. (2005). Psychosis in the elderly. London: Taylor & Francis. ISBN 1841843946. OCLC 475689721.
- Ames, David; Chiu, Edmond, eds. (2009). Neuroimaging and the psychiatry of late life. Cambridge: Cambridge University Press. ISBN 9780521112475. OCLC 36127171.
- Ames, David; Chiu, Edmond; Lindesay, James; Shulman, Kenneth I (2010). Guide to the psychiatry of old age. Cambridge: Cambridge University Press. ISBN 9780521681919. OCLC 957275711.
- Ames, David; O'Brien, John; Burns, Alistair, eds. (2017). Dementia (5th ed.). CRC Press, Taylor & Francis Group. ISBN 9781498703109. OCLC 1000611555.

== Awards and honors ==
- Officer (AO) in the General Division of the Order of Australia (2018)
- College Citation from Royal Australian and New Zealand College of Psychiatrists (2017)
- Recipient, Certificate of Outstanding Teaching, Joint Master of Psychological Medicine and Master of Psychiatry (2012)
- Fellow of the Australian Association of Gerontology (2001)
- Fellow of the Royal College of Psychiatrists (1997)
- Fellow of the Royal Australian and New Zealand College of Psychiatrists (1989)
- Upjohn prize for Clinical Pharmacology and Therapeutics (1978)
