= Dementia UK =

UK charity

- Formation: 1995
- Type: Charity
- Purpose: Supporting those with dementia
- Headquarters: London EC3N
- Region served: United Kingdom
- Key people: Hilda Hayo (Chief Executive); Professor David Croisdale-Appleby OBE (Chief Executive); Steve Clarke (Honorary Treasurer); Emma Crozier (Trustee); Gavin Sanderson (Trustee); Mark Stroyan (Trustee); Philippa Armitage (Trustee); Steve Jamieson (Trustee); Bill Roe (Trustee); Jane Keir (Trustee)
- Website: www.dementiauk.org

Dementia UK is a charitable organisation in the United Kingdom. It aims to support those living with dementia and their families, primarily through their specialists nurses, called Admiral Nurses.

As of 2022, they have 376 Admiral Nurses working throughout the UK.

== History ==
A specialist training program was initially set up in 1988, before the first Admiral Nurses were appointed in 1990 at the Middlesex Hospital. This eventually resulted in the establishment of the Dementia Relief Trust in 1995, later to be renamed Dementia UK.

The project was started by Ninot Levy and Jane Jason, wife and daughter of property developer Joseph Levy CBE BEM, who was diagnosed with vascular dementia in the 1980s and was inspired by the specialist support given by Macmillan Nurses to those with cancer.

The name Admiral Nurse was derived from Joseph Levy's nickname of 'Admiral Joe' due to his love of sailing.

== Organisation and governance ==
Dementia UK is registered in England and Wales as a charity and a company limited by guarantee. It is governed by a Board of Trustees, of which the current chair is Professor David Croisdale-Appleby. The current Chief Executive is Dr Hilda Hayo.

Original founder Jane Jason, now holds position of Honorary President.

== Activities ==
Through its work, Dementia UK aims to provide support to those living with dementia, as well as their families and carers.

=== Admiral Nurses ===
The Admiral Nurse program is the charity's primary offering, providing specialist dementia nurses to those that require support.

Admiral Nurses work in NHS hospitals, care homes, hospices, GP practices, as well as throughout local communities.

=== Dementia Helpline ===
The Dementia Helpline is a freephone telephone number, staffed by Admiral Nurses, designed to offer advice and support to those caring for people with dementia. The phone line is open 7 days a week, including bank holidays, expect for Christmas Day.

=== Virtual Clinics ===
Virtual Clinic appointments lasting 45 minutes are also provided Admiral Nurses, intended to help people understand a dementia diagnosis and learn how to provide effective care and support.

=== Young Dementia Network ===
The Young Dementia Network was established in 2016, before being absorbed into Dementia UK, following a merger with YoungDementia UK in November 2020. It is intended to provide opportunity for knowledge share, campaigning and collaboration between professionals and those affected by young onset dementia.

=== Lived Experience Advisory Panel (LEAP) ===
The Lived Experience Advisory Panel is a group of people living with dementia and their carers, who regularly meet in order to feedback into and help form policies and practices of Dementia UK, from their own personal experiences.

== Ambassadors ==
Dementia UK works with various celebrity ambassadors to promote their causes. These include:

- Emma Barton
- Jim Broadbent
- Judy Parfitt
- Barbara Pointon
- Lorelei King
- Naughty Boy
- Phyllis Logan

== See also ==
- Alzheimer's Society
- Alzheimer's Research UK
- Age UK
- Carers UK
