= Alzheimer's disease and COVID-19 =

Studies have shown that Alzheimer's disease (AD) patients are at an increased risk of morbidity and mortality from SARS-CoV-2, the virus that causes COVID-19. AD is the most common cause of dementia worldwide and is clinically defined by amyloid beta plaques, neurofibrillary tangles, and activation of the brain's immune system. While COVID-19 has been known to more severely impact elderly populations, AD patients have been shown to have a higher rate of SARS-CoV-2 infection compared to cognitively normal patients. The disproportionate risk of COVID-19 in AD patients is thought to arise from an interplay of biological and social factors between the two diseases. Many common biological pathways are shared between COVID-19 and AD, notably those involved in inflammation. Genetic factors that put individuals at risk for AD, such as the APOE4 genotype, are associated with worse outcomes during SARS-CoV-2 infection. Cognitive impairment in AD may prevent patients from following proper public health guidelines, such as masking and social distancing, increasing their risk of infection. Additionally, studies have shown cognitively normal COVID-19 patients are at an increased risk of AD diagnosis following recovery, suggesting that COVID-19 has the potential to cause AD.

== Contribution of AD to increased risk of COVID-19 ==
Multiple studies have shown that AD patients are at a significantly increased risk of death due to COVID-19. AD diagnosis was one of the major risk factors in predicting death due to complications from COVID-19. Patients with AD were also at a higher risk of death due to COVID-19 compared to patients with frontotemporal dementia. A separate study assessing the contribution of underlying conditions towards death due to COVID-19 found that the three strongest predictors of mortality were age, chronic lung disease, and AD. Data collected from 93 countries shows that AD has a stronger association with mortality due to COVID-19 than both asthma and chronic obstructive pulmonary disease (COPD).

Factors in Alzheimer's disease that lead to an increased risk of COVID-19 infection
Factor	Role in AD	Contribution to COVID-19 risk	Citation
Age	Increased risk of developing AD	Increased risk of severe COVID-19	
APOE4 genotype	Increased risk of developing AD	Increased risk of severe COVID-19	
Blood-brain barrier	Breaks down in AD	Increased risk of brain infection	
Requirement for caretaker	Required for many AD patients	Increased risk of transmission from caretaker	
Memory deficits	Increased in AD	Decreased ability to remember public health measures	
Wandering	Seen in AD	Increased risk of contacting infected persons	

=== Age ===
Age is one of the primary contributors to the risk of AD, over 10% of individuals over 65 years of age are thought to have the disease. Likewise age is also a primary risk factor for morbidity and mortality associated with COVID-19. As AD patients are generally older, they are more susceptible to negative outcomes in COVID-19 infection. In aged individuals and those with AD, chronic inflammation present at baseline is thought to play a role in the poor prognosis observed following viral infection.

=== Social factors influencing infection ===
The COVID-19 pandemic prompted the introduction of numerous public health measures to curb the virus' spread, including recommendations on hand washing, social distancing, and masking. Due to the effect of dementia on memory and cognition, AD patients often are unable to remember or properly follow public health measures. As such, this increases the risk of contracting COVID-19. Moreover, as dementia patients are susceptible to wandering which, when combined with lack of adherence to public health protocols, can increase contact with infected people. In addition, many dementia patients live in assisted living facilities, which have an overall higher rate of COVID-19 transmission due to poor social distancing between residents and staff. Many AD patients, especially those with advanced disease, are dependent on others to provide basic care, such as hygiene and feeding. In these situations, social distancing is not possible, thus increasing the risk of infection from caregivers.

=== APOE4 genotype ===
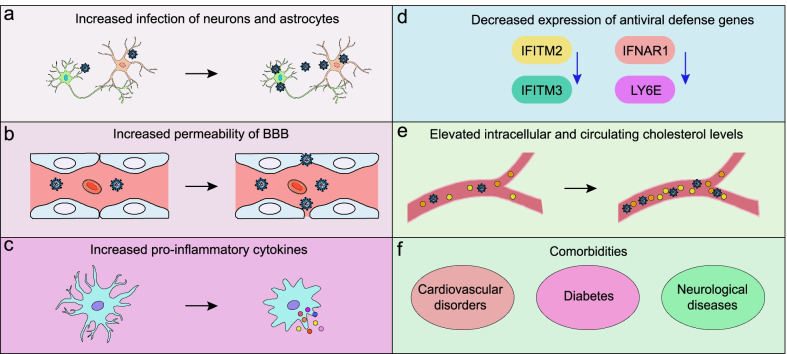
How APOE4 genotype influences COVID-19 pathology

Studies have shown a degree of overlap between genetic risk factors for AD and severity of COVID-19. The primary genetic risk factor for late onset AD is the presence of the Apolipoprotein E (APOE) 4 allele. APOE is a protein that is responsible for transporting cholesterol and other lipids between cells. It is present in the brain, where it is secreted by resident immune cells, as well as in the cardiovascular system. Patients carrying the APOE4 gene variant are at a higher risk of developing AD due to impaired clearance of Aβ from the brain. Approximately 14.8% of AD patients carry two copies of the APOE4 allele, in comparison to 1.9% of the general population. In addition to its role in AD, APOE4 carriers are also at an increased risk of developing severe COVID-19 and dying due to the disease. Aside from its role in Aβ clearance, APOE4 increases the risk of cardiovascular disease, which is associated with mortality and morbidity due to SARS-CoV-2 infection. Furthermore, APOE4 carriers may show a decreased ability to express key genes involved in the antiviral response, which may compromise the ability to fight the virus in AD patients carrying the allele. Additionally, APOE4 carriers show increased secretion of pro-inflammatory cytokines in response to viral stimulation and show increased BBB permeability, respectively increasing the risk of severe disease and neuroinvasion. In induced pluripotent stem cell (iPSC)-derived neurons, APOE4 genotype has been shown to increase the rate of SARS-CoV-2 Infection.

=== Blood-brain barrier ===
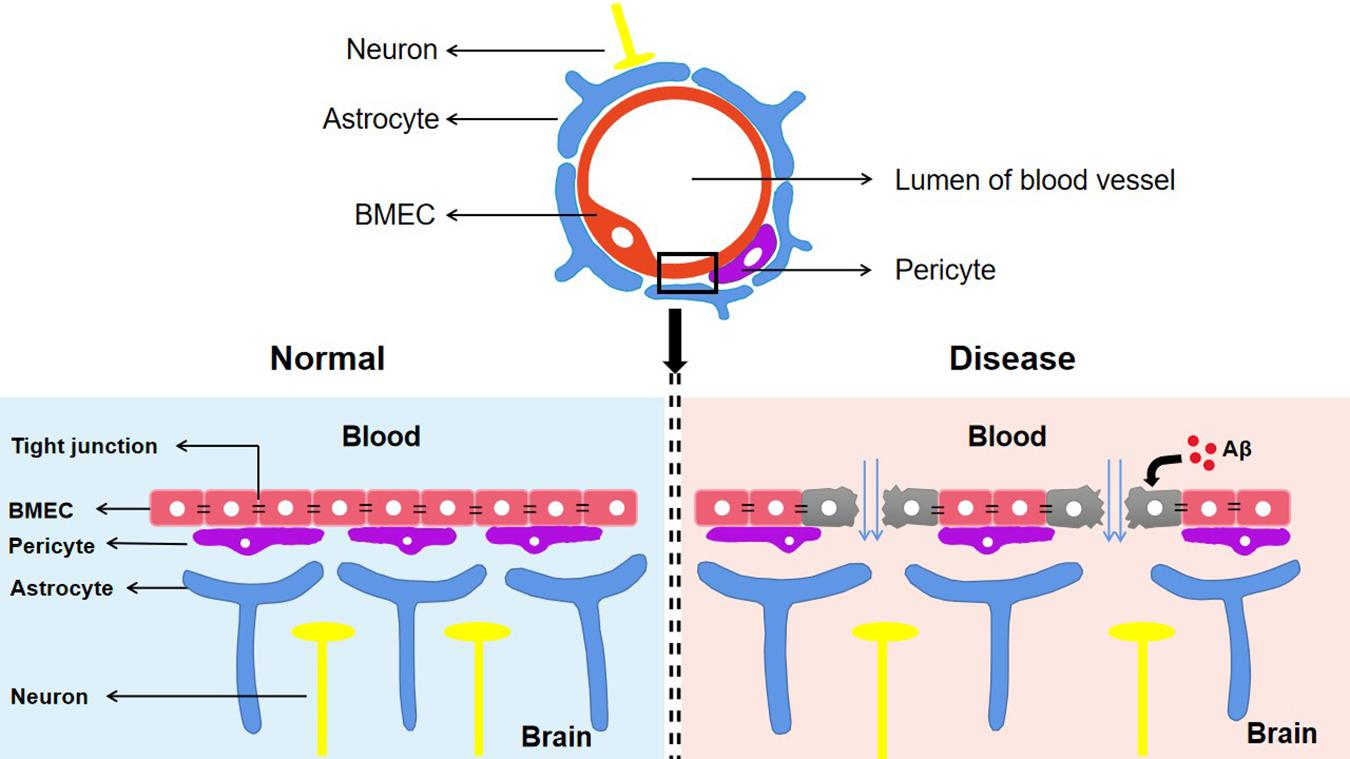
Dysfunction of the blood brain barrier in Alzheimer's disease

The blood-brain barrier is integral in protecting the brain from external objects, including waste, circulating blood cells, and infectious agents. It is formed by tight junctions between the endothelial cells of blood vessels, only allowing certain molecules from the blood to access the central nervous system. A decline in the integrity of the BBB has long been associated with AD and contributes to disease progression by allowing neurotoxic factors from the blood to enter the brain. As the BBB declines in AD, it is thought to allow increased passage of SARS-CoV-2 particles into the brain, enhancing the risk of severe neurological complications resulting from infection.

== Contribution of COVID-19 to AD risk and progression ==
Research has shown that there is a link between prior infection with certain viruses and the development of neurodegenerative diseases later in life. This extends to AD, where infection with viruses such as herpes simplex virus (HSV), varicella zoster virus (VZV), or Epstein-Barr virus (EBV), among others, increases risk of developing AD. In a study of 6,245,282 patients, it was observed that cognitively normal individuals over 65 are at an increased risk of a new dementia diagnosis following COVID-19 infection. Moreover, COVID-19 has been shown to potentially exacerbate the progression of existing AD, leading to increased research interest into the interaction between the two diseases

Factors in COVID-19 infection and management that increase risk of developing Alzheimer's disease
Factor	Effect of COVID-19	Contribution to AD risk and progression	Citation
Renin-angiotensin System	Increased angiotensin II and AT1R signaling	High angiotensin II can increase progression of neurodegeneration in AD	
ACE2 enzyme	Receptor for SARS-CoV-2 infection, decreased due to COVID-19 infection	Increased risk of AD due to accumulation of beta-amyloid	
NLRP3 inflammasome	Increased activity in COVID-19 infection to fight virus	Increased risk of AD due to increased deposition of beta-amyloid	
Cytokines	Increased levels in COVID-19 infection to fight virus	Contribute to neurodegeneration in AD	
Face masking	Required in many care scenarios to prevent viral spread	Worsen psychiatric symptoms, such as agitation and distress, in AD patients due to impaired facial recognition	
Social isolation	Required in many cases to prevent viral spread	Isolation leads to worsening of psychiatric symptoms in AD, chronic isolation may lead to increased risk of AD later in life	

=== Renin-angiotensin system and ACE family enzymes ===
The renin-angiotensin system (RAS), which is involved in blood pressure regulation, plays a unique and important role in the brain. The RAS system involves the proteins angiotensinogen, renin, and ACE, all of which are present in the brain. Renin is an enzyme that cleaves angiotensinogen into angiotensin I (Ang I), while ACE converts Ang I into Ang II. Ang II can either bind to the angiotensin II type 1 receptor (AT1R), which promotes inflammation and damages neurons, or the AT2R, which reduces inflammation and protects neurons. At higher levels of Ang II, the AT1R is preferably activated, causing inflammation, decreased blood flow to the brain, and cognitive impairment in the long term. Ang II can be cleaved by ACE2 into more neuroprotective species, such as Ang III and IV, which counteract the effect of Ang II. In AD, AT1R signaling has been shown to be increased, contributing to neurodegeneration and cognitive impairment.

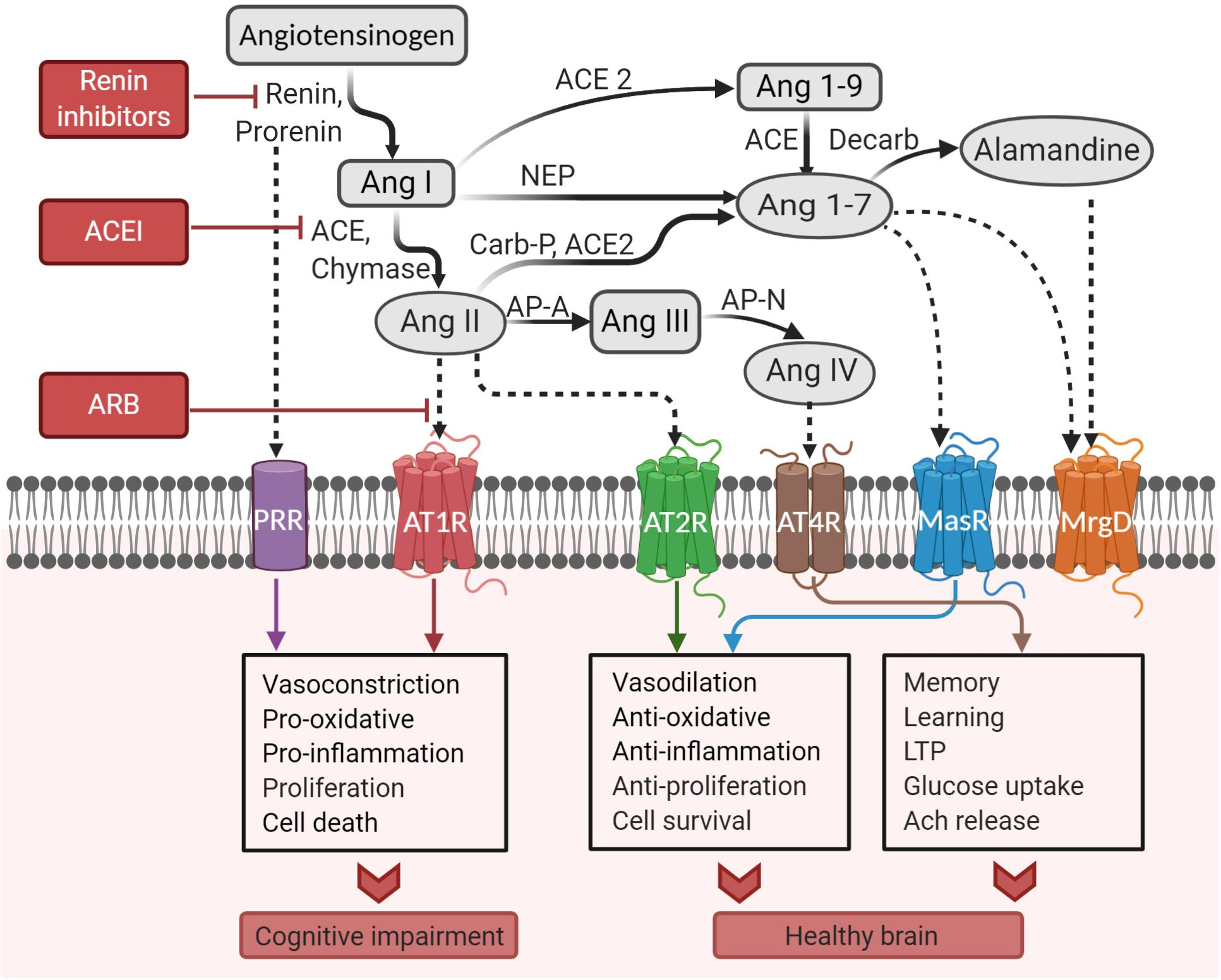
Brain renin-angiotensin pathway and effectors

Some studies have found a link between increased ACE2 in the brain and AD, however this remains controversial. ACE2 has been shown to potentially play a protective role in AD, as ACE2 decreases activity of the Ang II/AT1R axis. Additionally, ACE2 has been shown to have benefits in AD besides the classical RAS. Administration of ACE2 activating drugs can reduce amyloid plaques and prevent cognitive symptoms in mouse models of AD. One of the targets of ACE2 is brain derived neurotrophic factor (BDNF), a protein that supports proper neuron function and is decreased in AD. Additionally, ACE2 has been shown to convert toxic Aβ43 into protective Aβ40, decreasing amyloid burden.

Binding of SARS-CoV-2 to ACE2 inhibits its function. This is exacerbated in AD, as one of the major toxic species of Aβ, Aβ42, has been shown to interact with the SARS-CoV-2 spike protein to increase its binding to ACE2. Inhibition of ACE2 due to infection ultimately leads to increased accumulation of Aβ peptides and decreased activation of BDNF, accelerating neurodegeneration in AD. Additionally, inhibition of ACE2 by SARS-CoV-2 causes increased Ang II, contributing to neuronal stress in AD. As such, SARS-CoV-2 infection can accelerate AD progression through both the classic RAS pathway and alternative mechanisms.

=== NLRP3 inflammasome ===
The nucleotide-binding oligomerization domain, leucine-rich repeat-containing protein (NLRP) family of proteins are crucial mediators of the innate immune response to pathogens. NLRP3 is one protein in this family that is involved in the body's response to bacteria, fungi, and viruses. Upon recognition of pathogen-associated molecular patterns (PAMPs) or damage-associated molecular patterns (DAMPs), an immune cell will initially prime an inflammatory response by increasing expression of NLRP3 (signal 1). NLRP3 will become active once the cell receives an additional "activation signal", normally consisting of toxins, viral RNA, or signs of cell damage. Once activated, NLRP3 will interact with two other proteins, ASC and pro-caspase-1, to form the inflammasome, a circular structure made of multiple copies of each involved protein. From here, the NLRP3 inflammasome will cleave inactive pro-inflammatory proteins such as pro-interleukin(IL)-1β and pro-IL-18 to their active forms, which continue to promote inflammation.

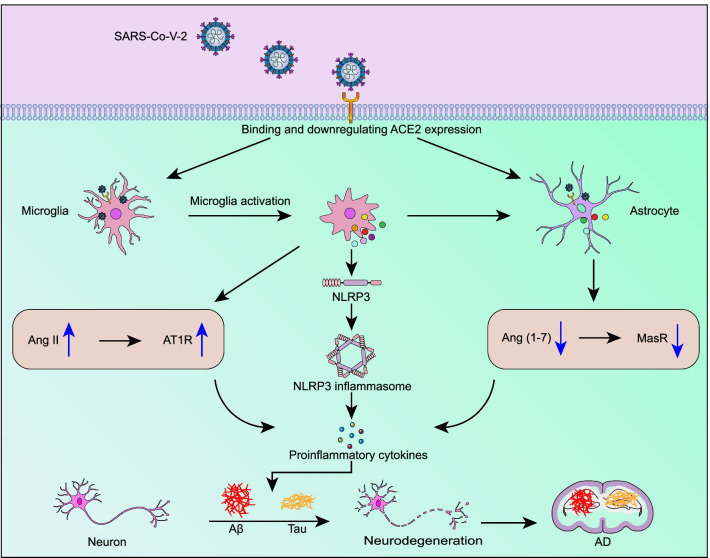
Pathways involved in increased risk of AD following COVID-19 infection

Studies have shown involvement of the NLRP3 inflammasome in AD. The expression of genes related to inflammasome activation were shown to be increased in AD, while stimulation of immune cells with Aβ42 can directly activate it. Aβ plaques and oligomers can function similar to DAMPs, priming and activating the NLRP3 inflammasome. Additionally, Aβ that has been phagocytosed by microglia can damage lysosomes, cellular structures containing waste, causing release of cathepsin B, an endogenous molecule that can activate the NLRP3 inflammasome. Consequently, activation of the NLRP3 inflammasome prevents microglia from ingesting Aβ42, creating a positive feedback loop towards neuroinflammation as Aβ buildup can further activate additional inflammasomes. NLRP3 activation can also arise from hyperphosphorylated tau, and can consequently lead to additional tau phosphorylation. This chronic activation of the NLRP3 inflammasome ultimately contributes to chronic inflammation and neurodegeneration in AD. Being a virus, SARS-CoV-2 can activate the NLRP3 inflammasome, triggering inflammation required to fight infection. It is through this mechanism that SARS-CoV-2 is thought to increase deposition of toxic Aβ42 and hyperphosphorylated tau, worsening AD pathology. The subsequent increase in inflammatory cytokines can further lead to neurodegeneration and cognitive impairment.

=== Cytokines ===
Cytokines are cellular messages given off by immune cells and different tissues that can help promote or stop an immune response. These molecules are produced as a part of the normal immune response and are greatly increased due to SARS-CoV-2 infection. However, uncontrolled cytokine release can be detrimental or even fatal, especially in cases of severe COVID-19. In addition to their role in viral infections, cytokines are highly abundant in the brains of AD patients. While initially produced to help clear toxic Aβ, chronic cytokine release is thought to play an important role in causing and progressing neuroinflammation. Many cytokines involved in AD are also increased due to COVID-19 infection, such as IL-6, IL-1, and tumor necrosis factor alpha (TNF-α). While these cytokines are essential in mounting a response to COVID-19 infection, they may consequently drive neurodegeneration in AD patients.

=== Social factors influencing worsening of AD symptoms ===
The onset of the COVID-19 pandemic brought many public health measures into the spotlight, such as lockdowns and mandatory face mask use. Social isolation of AD patients due to COVID-related lockdowns has been shown to worsen the psychiatric symptoms of AD, including depression, agitation, and hallucinations. This partially is thought to arise from lack of socialization and mental stimulation associated with caregiver programs and social interaction.

Multiple studies have shown that regular physical exercise can reduce the risk of developing AD or other forms of dementia. Exercise is associated with increased blood flow to the brain and improved cognitive function. Exercise has also been shown to potentially improve psychiatric symptoms and slow the decline in the ability to perform daily tasks in AD patients. Lockdowns during the early stages of the COVID-19 pandemic have greatly hindered the ability for many individuals to engage in physical activities, which may worsen dementia risk and progression.

Additionally, AD patients often require a sense of familiarity in their surroundings and those they interact with. Despite the need for familiarity, AD patients often have trouble recognizing faces. Mandatory face masking, while essential to prevent viral spread, can further impair facial recognition in AD. This has been proposed to contribute to distress and declining mental health in AD patients.
