= Peanut butter test =

Diagnostic test for Alzheimer's disease

- Purpose: An attempt to detect Alzheimer's disease

The peanut butter test is a diagnostic test which aims to detect Alzheimer's disease by measuring subjects' ability to smell peanut butter through each nostril. The original study, published in the Journal of the Neurological Sciences in October 2013, involves measuring the ability of people to smell peanut butter held close to their nose. The researchers believe that people with Alzheimer's were not able to smell the peanut butter as well through their left nostril as their right one.

However, these results were somewhat inconclusive due to a small sample size and unable to be replicated in a subsequent study.

== Proposed explanation ==
The lead author of the 2013 article, Jennifer J. Stamps, had concluded, from her own research, that the sense of smell is dependent upon the olfactory nerve, and also noted that this nerve is one of the first things to be affected by cognitive decline. Likewise, the front part of the temporal lobe has not only been implicated in olfaction, but is also known to be one of the first areas of the brain to degenerate due to Alzheimer's. The researchers also expected the difference to be in the left nostril because in Alzheimer's, the left side of the brain is usually affected first, and because the sense of olfaction is ipsilateral—that is, the side of the body that picks up the odor is the same as the side of the brain that processes it.

== Implications ==
Stamps cautioned that they can currently only use the test to confirm already-established diagnoses, but added that "...we plan to study patients with mild cognitive impairment to see if this test might be used to predict which patients are going to get Alzheimer's disease." NPR also reported that the study, at 94 patients, was "too small to be conclusive." In 2012, a systematic review had found that while there may be "an association between decreased olfaction and AD," "rigorously designed longitudinal cohort studies are necessary to clarify the value of olfactory identification testing in predicting the onset of AD."

Ivan Oransky, former global editorial director of MedPage Today, also criticized the media's favorable coverage of the study, noting that the journal in which it was published, the Journal of the Neurological Sciences, "is ranked in the bottom third of neuroscience journals by Thomson Scientific's impact factor, 162 out of 252." He also asked three other Alzheimer's researchers—Richard Caselli, Sam Gandy, and George Bartzokis—what they thought about the proposed test, and their responses were less than enthusiastic. For example, Bartzokis said, "The principal problem with smell tests is that they are nonspecific and therefore only one small piece of the diagnostic puzzle."

== Attempts at replication ==
In 2014, a study was published, also in the Journal of the Neurological Sciences, which found no evidence of a left-right asymmetry in nasal function in Alzheimer's disease patients.
