= NINCDS-ADRDA Alzheimer's Criteria =

Alzheimer's Disease diagnostic

The NINCDS-ADRDA Alzheimer's Criteria were proposed in 1984 by the National Institute of Neurological and Communicative Disorders and Stroke and the Alzheimer's Disease and Related Disorders Association (now known as the Alzheimer's Association) and are among the most used in the diagnosis of Alzheimer's disease (AD). These criteria require that the presence of cognitive impairment and a suspected dementia syndrome be confirmed by neuropsychological testing for a clinical diagnosis of possible or probable AD; while they need histopathologic confirmation (microscopic examination of brain tissue) for the definitive diagnosis. They specify as well eight cognitive domains that may be impaired in AD. These criteria have shown good reliability and validity.

== Criteria ==
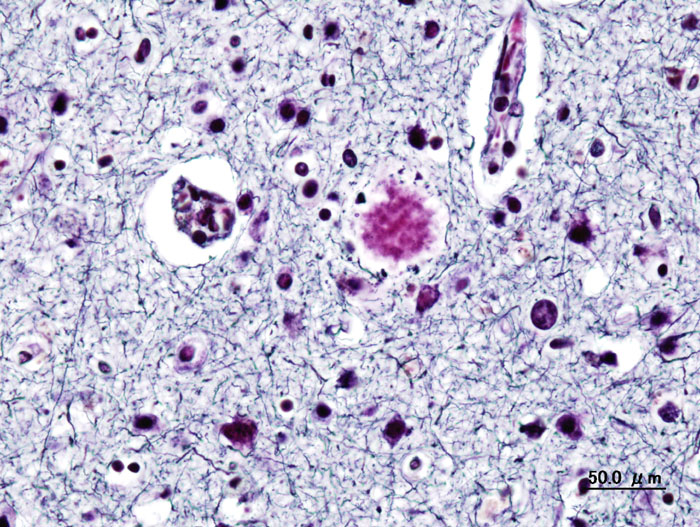
Histopathologic confirmation of a presenile case of definite Alzheimer's disease.

- Definite Alzheimer's disease: The patient meets the criteria for probable Alzheimer's disease and has histopathologic evidence of AD via autopsy or biopsy.
- Probable Alzheimer's disease: Dementia has been established by clinical and neuropsychological examination. Cognitive impairments also have to be progressive and be present in two or more areas of cognition. The onset of the deficits has been between the ages of 40 and 90 years and finally there must be an absence of other diseases capable of producing a dementia syndrome.
- Possible Alzheimer's disease: There is a dementia syndrome with an atypical onset, presentation or progression; and without a known etiology; but no co-morbid diseases capable of producing dementia are believed to be in the origin of it.
- Unlikely Alzheimer's disease: The patient presents a dementia syndrome with a sudden onset, focal neurologic signs or gait disturbance early in the course of the illness.

== Cognitive domains ==
The NINCDS-ADRDA Alzheimer's Criteria specify eight cognitive domains that may be impaired in AD: memory, language, perceptual skills, attention, constructive abilities, orientation, problem solving and functional abilities.

== Other criteria ==
Similar to the NINCDS-ADRDA Alzheimer's Criteria are the DSM-IV-TR criteria published by the American Psychiatric Association. At the same time the advances in functional neuroimaging techniques such as PET or SPECT that have already proven their utility to differentiate Alzheimer's disease from other possible causes, have led to proposals of revision of the NINCDS-ADRDA criteria that take into account these techniques.
