= Barbara Pointon =

Barbara Moore Pointon (13 August 1939 - 21 June 2020) was a British composer and teacher. She is best remembered for winning a landmark legal case in 2004 which established the right of British citizens to receive continuing healthcare (CHC) funding for dementia care in their own homes in addition to the already-established funding for dementia care in nursing homes.

Pointon was born in Longton, Stoke-on-Trent, to Doris Chadwick and Leslie Moore, an organ-maker and piano tuner. She attended Thistley Hough grammar school, then won a music scholarship to the University of Birmingham. In 1959 and 1960, she received a Barber scholarship, then earned an honors degree in music. She married Malcom Pointon, a fellow student, in 1964 and they had two sons.

Pointon became a music teacher at Shire Oak grammar school, then a senior lecturer in music at Homerton College, Cambridge. She became head of the department and introduced her students to electronic music and other innovations.

In 1967, the family moved to Thriplow in Cambridgeshire, where they lived for the rest of their lives. There, Pointon founded the local school PTA, and led the amateur dramatic society and the children’s music club. In 1991, Malcolm was diagnosed with Alzheimer’s disease, and his wife became a caregiver. Later in the 1990s, she helped design Denbigh ward in Fulbourn Hospital for people with dementia.

Pointon lobbied Parliament relentlessly for government funding of home health care for dementia patients. She became a representative of several dementia charities such as the Alzheimer’s Society, the government’s standing commission on carers, and two ministerial advisory boards on dementia. She contributed to the government’s national dementia strategy and to a Department of Health training guide, serving as an ambassador for Dementia UK for 21 years. In 2006, she was awarded a Member of the Order of the British Empire (MBE) for her services to the caretakers of dementia patients. Malcolm died in 2007. In 2018, Pointon developed dementia herself and died in 2020. In 2022, the Pointon family funded the Barbara and Malcolm Pointon Music Room in Thriplow School in honor of Barbara and Malcolm.

Barbara’s musical compositions included:

- Hymn to St. Thomas of Canterbury
- songs for a pictogram system for remedial readers
- Triptych (for string quartet)
