= Pharmacology & Therapeutics =

- Discipline: Pharmacology
- Language: English
- Edited by: Michael Curtis

Publication details
- History: 1976–present
- Publisher: Elsevier
- Frequency: Monthly
- Open access: Hybrid
- Impact factor: 12.0 (2023)

Standard abbreviations
- ISO 4: Pharmacol. Ther.

Indexing
- CODEN: PHTHDT
- ISSN: 0163-7258 (print); 1879-016X (web)
- OCLC no.: 04981366

Links
- Journal homepage; Online archive

Pharmacology & Therapeutics is a monthly medical review journal published by Elsevier. It incorporates Pharmacology & Therapeutics. Part A: Chemotherapy, Toxicology and Metabolic Inhibitors and Pharmacology & Therapeutics. Part B: General and Systematic Pharmacology, both originally published by Oxford University Press.

The journal is included in Index Medicus/MEDLINE/PubMed and the Science Citation Index Expanded. According to the Journal Citation Reports, the journal has a 2023 impact factor of 12.0.

The editor-in-chief is Sam J. Enna (University of Kansas Medical Center).
