= Granulovacuolar degeneration =

Granulovacuolar degeneration refers to the occurrence within neurons of abnormal, fluid-filled bubbles (vacuoles) containing a dense proteinaceous granule. Granulovacuoles occur most commonly in pyramidal neurons of the hippocampus, although in some circumstances they can be found in neurons in other parts of the brain. They are present in small numbers in non-demented elderly people, but they increase in frequency in Alzheimer's disease and other tauopathies. In Alzheimer's disease, granulovacuoles proliferate stage-wise in different brain areas, and their prevalence is correlated with the degree of tauopathy, Aβ plaque pathology, and cerebral amyloid angiopathy. Immunohistochemical analyses have found evidence that the inner granule includes proteins such as tubulin tau protein, TDP-43 and several others. However, the presence of some proteins, including tau, has been questioned because of technical limitations in the immunohistochemical detection of certain protein epitopes.

Although granulovacuoles and their functional significance are incompletely understood, they have been compared to autophagic vacuoles and to proteolytically active lysosomes. In experimental models, granulovacuoles can be generated when tauopathy is induced in cells by exposure to abnormally folded seeds of tau protein. The inclusions also can be found within some neurons in cases of Parkinson's disease, and they are experimentally inducible by exposure of cells to abnormal α-synuclein seeds, suggesting that they are not characteristic only of tauopathies. Studies in cell culture indicate that the formation of granulovacuoles is regulated by casein kinase 1δ, and that they may serve to protect neurons from tauopathy-mediated neurodegeneration.

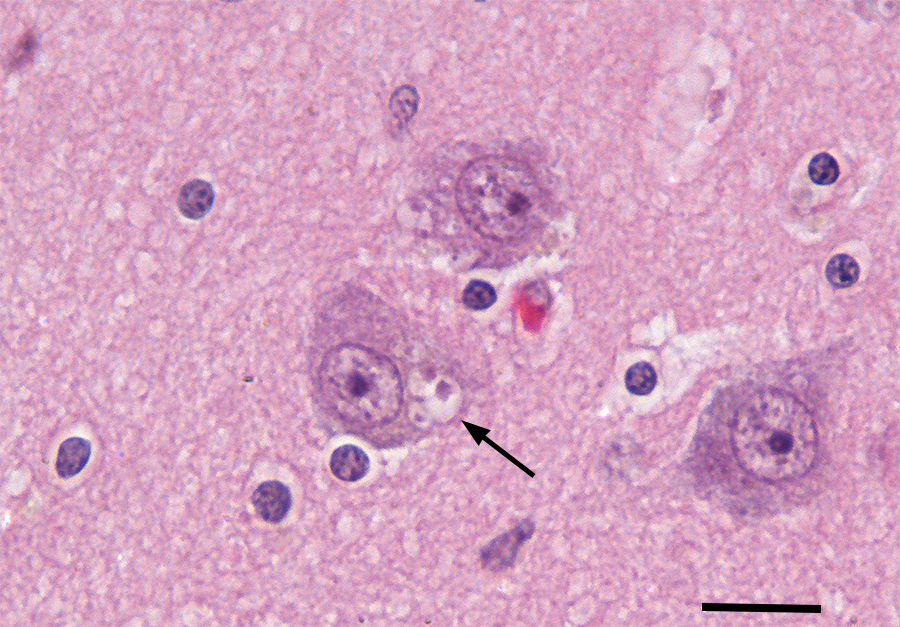
Granulovacuolar degeneration (arrow designates one cluster of vacuoles) in the cytoplasm of pyramidal neurons in the hippocampal formation of a person with Alzheimer's disease. Hematoxylin and eosin stain. Scale bar = 20 microns (0.02mm).
