= Malcolm Pointon =

English pianist (died 2007)

Malcolm Pointon (died February 2007) was a pianist and lecturer from Thriplow, England, and together with his wife Barbara Pointon, the subject of the film Malcolm and Barbara - A Love Story shown in 1999, and, more recently, of an Independent Television program entitled Malcolm and Barbara: Love’s Farewell, broadcast on Wednesday, 8 August 2007.

== Alzheimer's ==
Malcolm Pointon was diagnosed with Alzheimer's at the age of 51. From that time up to his death, he lived in Thriplow, Cambridgeshire.

After the diagnosis, Pointon's wife Barbara decided to allow film-maker Paul Watson to document the events on film, which took place over the course of 11 years, and she felt that if her husband could have understood, he would have said "Go for it".

Mrs. Pointon had complained to the Health Service Ombudsman and prior to the report made about the case in February 2004, in September 2003 was awarded £1,000 a week by the health authority to care for her husband. In response to statements made by the Alzheimer's Society, the Ombudsman took the unusual step of mentioning her by name, stating that the case did not set a precedent.

For her work campaigning for better care of those with Alzheimer's, Mrs. Pointon was included in The Queen's Birthday Honours of June 2006, and was awarded the MBE.

== Controversy ==
The program was the subject of controversy because the film ended with the death of Mr. Pointon, which turned out to be prematurely announced, as Pointon had entered a coma from which he would never awake, although he died seven days after the filming itself. His widow, Barbara Pointon, was a well known campaigner for improvements in the care of Alzheimer's before her death in 2020 from dementia.
