= Rob Pointon =

English painter

Rob Pointon (born 1982) is an English painter based in Cheshire known for his street scenes, particularly painting en plein air in varying weather conditions.

Pointon painted from an early age and studied Fine Art at Aberystwyth University before going on to complete The Drawing Year, a scholarship programme at the Royal Drawing School in London. Pointon is from Stoke-on-Trent and based in Cheshire, with a number of his paintings depicting Manchester. Having also painted scenes of Queen Elizabeth II's Platinum and Diamond Jubilees, Pointon was given special access to paint scenes of the Queen's funeral.
