= Depression of Alzheimer disease =

Depression is one of the most common psychiatric symptoms in Alzheimer's disease, occurring at all stages of the disease, but it often appears in a different form than other depressive disorders. In 2000, a workgroup of the U.S. National Institute of Mental Health created a set of provisional diagnostic criteria for depression of Alzheimer disease (dAD) as a separate diagnostic entity in its own right.

In 2005, psychiatrists at Johns Hopkins University School of Medicine created a set of operationalized criteria to aid the diagnosis of dAD in clinical practice.

== Causes ==
Although caregivers often feel that the fact of an Alzheimer's diagnosis must be creating depression in the affected person, there is little or no evidence that this is true. In fact, it is not clear how many people are capable of comprehending an Alzheimer's diagnosis at the time it is made. The symptoms of dAD can arise at any point during the course of Alzheimer's disease, often at a stage quite late in cognitive decline.

Numerous neurological studies have found correlations between abnormalities in the brain and depression in dementia. For dAD in particular, positron emission tomography (PET) studies have found alterations of metabolism in the right superior frontal gyrus.

== Symptoms ==
The diagnostic criteria for depression in Alzheimer disease specify that it requires only 3 of the possible symptoms for major depressive disorder (MDD), rather than the 5 required to diagnose MDD itself, and the symptoms may fluctuate. Therefore, dAD often goes unrecognized within the spectrum of symptoms of Alzheimer's disease.

In general, people who have dAD tend to be anxious, agitated, delusional, or inattentive. Symptoms include irritability and social isolation. People with dAD are more likely than those with MDD to show a decline in their enjoyment of social contacts or customary activities, but are less likely to express or experience guilt or feel suicidal.

== Diagnosis ==
Of course, diagnosis must rely on the criteria established by the NIMH working group on dAD.

Because of the cognitive decline characteristic of Alzheimer's disease, diagnosis of dAD needs to include independent interviews of the patient and caregiver. The Cornell Scale for Depression in Dementia is particularly useful because it allows for these separate assessments.

== Treatment ==
Educating the caregiver about depression in dementia is of primary importance in addressing the problem. Caregivers need to understand the need for structure and comfort in the patient's daily activities, as well as the importance of including activities that the patient finds enjoyable and of trying to convey a sense of pleasure themselves. Caregivers also need an opportunity to "vent" and to understand and express when they have exceeded their ability to address the patient's needs.

=== Psychosocial ===
Controlled trials show that providing pleasant daily activities or exercise, for someone who has Alzheimer's disease, in conjunction with activities designed to support the caregiver, can produce positive results in addressing the associated depression.

=== Medication ===
There are no official clinical guidelines as yet about the use of antidepressant medication for dAD in particular. Medication may be justified for people with diagnosed dAD who are suicidal, violent, not eating or drinking, or who score high on the Cornell scale.

The evidence would seem to suggest similar efficacy for SSRIs and tricyclic antidepressants in initial treatment for dAD. If these treatments do not address the symptoms, it would be reasonable to try noradrenergic drugs, secondary amine tricyclic antidepressants, or a monoamine oxidase inhibitor.

A clinical trial testing sertraline (Zoloft) for depression of Alzheimer disease, launched by the NIMH in 2004, was due to be completed in the summer of 2009.

Sertraline, as per the latest studies has been found to be ineffective in improving cognitive outcomes in patients with Alzheimer's disease. Sertraline is also associated with increased incidence of gastrointestinal and respiratory adverse effects.
