= Alzheimer's disease =

Progressive neurodegenerative disease

- Other names: Alzheimer's dementia
- Diagram of a normal brain compared to the brain of a person with Alzheimer's
- Pronunciation: /ˈæltshaɪmərz/, US also /ˈɑːlts-/
- Specialty: Neurology, psychiatry
- Symptoms: Memory loss, problems with language, disorientation, mood swings
- Complications: Infections, falls and aspiration pneumonia in the terminal stage
- Usual onset: Over 65 years old
- Duration: Long term
- Causes: Poorly understood
- Risk factors: Genetics, head injuries, clinical depression, hypertension, psychological stress, lack of physical and mental exercise
- Diagnostic method: Based on symptoms and cognitive testing after ruling out other possible causes
- Differential diagnosis: Normal brain aging, Lewy body dementia, Trisomy 21
- Medication: Acetylcholinesterase inhibitors, NMDA receptor antagonists
- Prognosis: 100% mortality, life expectancy 3–12 years
- Frequency: 50 million (2020)
- Named after: Alois Alzheimer

Alzheimer's disease (AD) is a neurodegenerative disease and is the most common cause of dementia, accounting for around 60–70% of cases. The most common early symptom is difficulty in remembering recent events. As the disease advances, symptoms can include problems with language, disorientation (including easily getting lost), mood swings, loss of motivation, self-neglect, and behavioral issues. As a person's condition declines, they often withdraw from family and society. Gradually, bodily functions are lost, ultimately leading to death. The median life expectancy following diagnosis of dementia is three to twelve years. Co-occurring movement disorder, also known as extrapyramidal signs, multiplies risk of death by 1.6.

The causes of Alzheimer's disease remain poorly understood. There are many environmental and genetic risk factors associated with its development. The strongest genetic risk factor is from an allele (genetic variant) of apolipoprotein E, a protein involved in the metabolism of fats in mammals. Other risk factors include a history of head injury, clinical depression, and high blood pressure. The progression of the disease is largely characterised by the accumulation of malformed protein deposits in the cerebral cortex, called amyloid plaques and neurofibrillary tangles. These misfolded protein aggregates interfere with normal cell function, and over time lead to irreversible degeneration of neurons and loss of synaptic connections in the brain. A probable diagnosis is based on the history of the illness and cognitive testing, with medical imaging and blood tests to rule out other possible causes. Initial symptoms are often mistaken for normal brain aging. Examination of brain tissue is the only way to definitively diagnose Alzheimer's, but neuroimaging techniques and fluid biomarkers have made it possible to diagnose probable Alzheimer's disease in vivo.

No known treatments can stop or reverse its progression, though some may temporarily improve symptoms. A healthy diet, physical activity, and social engagement are generally beneficial in aging, and may help in reducing the risk of cognitive decline and Alzheimer's. Affected people become increasingly reliant on others for assistance, often placing a burden on caregivers. The pressures can include social, psychological, physical, and economic elements. Exercise programs may be beneficial with respect to activities of daily living and can potentially improve outcomes. Behavioural problems or psychosis due to dementia are sometimes treated with antipsychotics, but this has an increased risk of early death.

As of 2020, there were approximately 50 million people worldwide with Alzheimer's disease. It most often begins in people over 65 years of age, although up to 10% of cases are early-onset impacting those in their 30s to mid-60s. It affects about 6% of people 65 years and older, and women more often than men. The disease is named after German psychiatrist and pathologist Alois Alzheimer, who first described it in 1906. Alzheimer's financial burden on society is large, with an estimated global annual cost of US$1 trillion. Alzheimer's and related dementias are ranked as the fifth leading cause of death worldwide.

Given the widespread impacts of Alzheimer's disease, both basic-science and health funders in many countries support Alzheimer's research at large scales. For example, the US National Institutes of Health program for Alzheimer's research, the National Plan to Address Alzheimer's Disease, has a budget of US$3.98 billion for fiscal year 2026. In the European Union, the 2020 Horizon Europe research programme awarded over €570 million for dementia-related projects.

== Signs and symptoms ==
The course of Alzheimer's is generally described in three stages, with a progressive pattern of cognitive and functional impairment. The three stages are described as early or mild, middle or moderate, and late or severe. The disease is known to target the hippocampus, which is associated with memory, and this is likely to be responsible for the first symptoms of memory impairment. As the disease progresses, so does the degree of memory impairment.

=== First symptoms ===
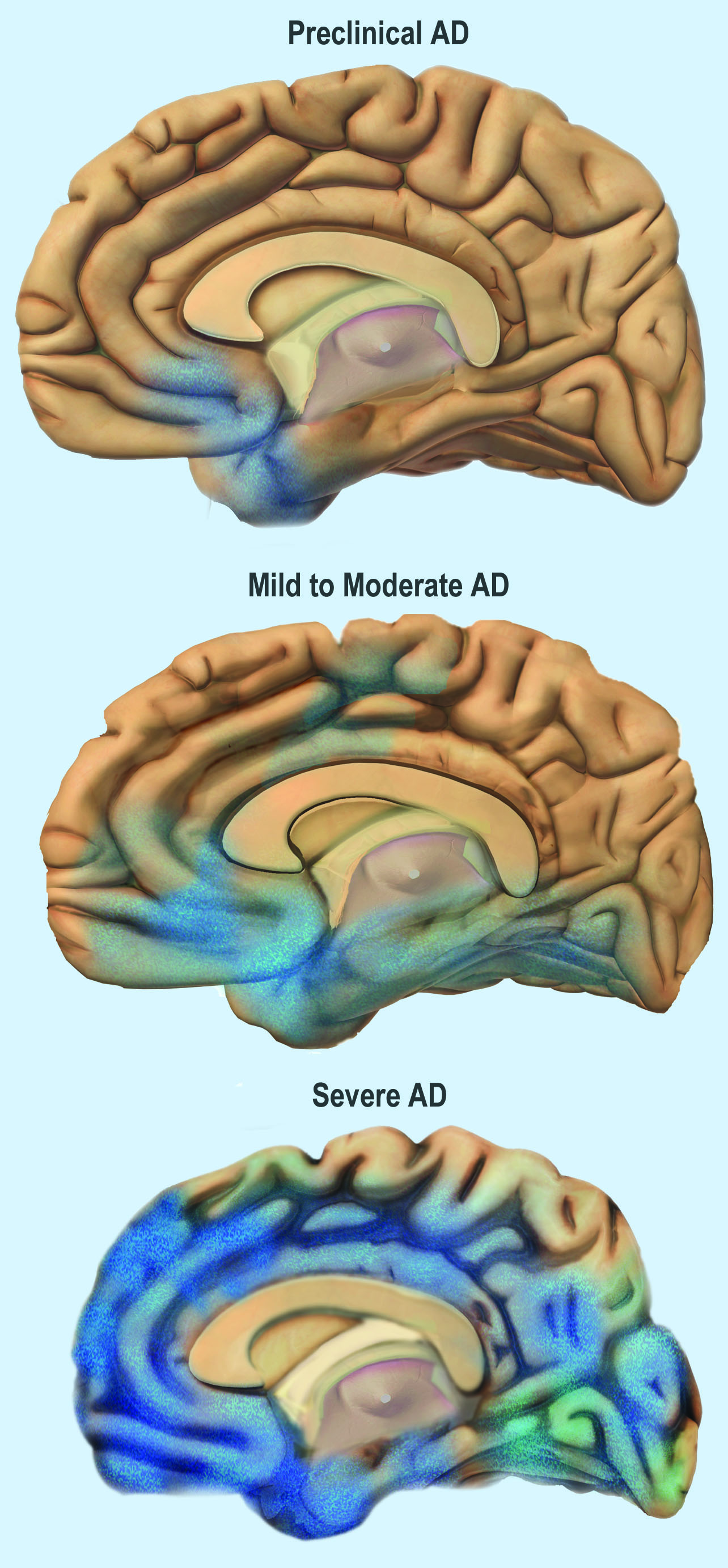
Stages of atrophy in Alzheimer's

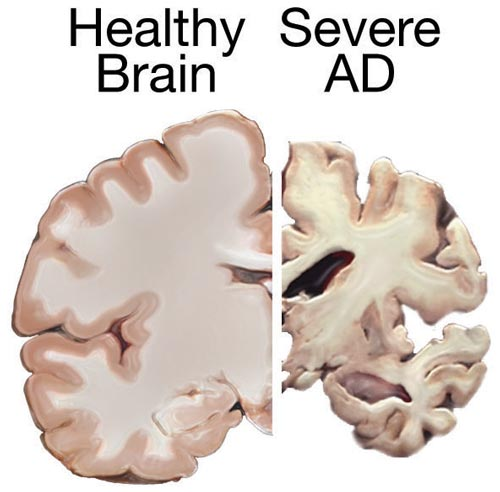
A normal brain on the left and a late-stage Alzheimer's brain on the right

The first symptoms are often mistakenly attributed to aging or stress. Detailed neuropsychological testing can reveal mild cognitive difficulties up to eight years before a person fulfills the clinical criteria for diagnosis of Alzheimer's disease. These early symptoms can affect the most complex activities of daily living. The most noticeable deficit is difficulty in remembering recently learned facts and inability to acquire new information.

Subtle problems with the executive functions of attentiveness, planning, flexibility, and abstract thinking, or impairments in semantic memory (memory of meanings and concept relationships) can also be symptomatic of the early stages of Alzheimer's disease. Apathy and depression can be seen at this stage, with apathy remaining as the most persistent symptom throughout the course of the disease. People with objective signs of cognitive impairment, but not more severe symptoms, may be diagnosed with mild cognitive impairment (MCI). If memory loss is the predominant symptom of MCI, it is termed amnestic MCI and is frequently seen as a prodromal or early stage of Alzheimer's disease. Amnestic MCI has a greater than 90% likelihood of being associated with Alzheimer's.

The sense of smell is frequently lost in Alzheimer's diseases, although this is also true of other neurodegenerative disorders. Reported unilateral loss of smell, detected with peanut butter test, was proposed in 2013, and debunked the following year.

=== Early stage ===
In people with early stage Alzheimer's disease, there is increasing impairment of learning and memory. In a small percentage, difficulties with language, executive functions, perception (agnosia), or execution of movements (apraxia) are more prominent than memory problems. Alzheimer's disease does not affect all memory capacities equally. Older memories of the person's life (episodic memory), facts learned (semantic memory), and implicit memory (the memory of the body on how to do things, such as using a fork to eat or how to drink from a glass) are affected to a lesser degree than new facts or memories.

Language problems are mainly characterised by a shrinking vocabulary and decreased word fluency, leading to a general impoverishment of oral and written language. In this stage, the person with Alzheimer's is usually capable of communicating basic ideas adequately. While performing fine motor tasks such as writing, drawing, or dressing, certain movement coordination and planning difficulties (apraxia) may be present; however, they are commonly unnoticed. As the disease progresses, people with Alzheimer's disease can often continue to perform many tasks independently; however, they may need assistance or supervision with the most cognitively demanding activities.

=== Middle stage ===
Progressive deterioration eventually hinders independence, with subjects being unable to perform the most common activities of daily living. Speech difficulties become evident due to an inability to recall vocabulary, which leads to frequent incorrect word substitutions (paraphasias). Reading and writing skills are also progressively lost. Complex motor sequences become less coordinated as time passes and Alzheimer's disease progresses, so the risk of falling increases. During this phase, memory problems worsen, and the person may fail to recognise close relatives. Long-term memory, which was previously intact, becomes impaired.

Behavioral and neuropsychiatric changes become more prevalent. Common manifestations are wandering, irritability and emotional lability, leading to crying, outbursts of unpremeditated aggression, or resistance to caregiving. Sundowning can also appear. Approximately 30% of people with Alzheimer's disease develop delusional misidentifications and other delusional symptoms. Subjects also lose insight of their disease process and limitations (anosognosia). Urinary incontinence can develop. These symptoms create stress for relatives and caregivers, which can be reduced by moving the person from home care to other long-term care facilities.

=== Late stage ===
During the final stage, known as the late-stage or severe stage, there is complete dependence on caregivers. Language is reduced to simple phrases or even single words, eventually leading to complete loss of speech. Despite the loss of verbal language abilities, people can often understand and return emotional signals. Although aggressiveness can still be present, extreme apathy and exhaustion are much more common symptoms. People with Alzheimer's disease will ultimately not be able to perform even the simplest tasks independently; muscle mass and mobility deteriorate to the point where they are bedridden and unable to feed themselves. The cause of death is usually an external factor, such as infection of pressure ulcers or pneumonia, not the disease itself. In some cases, there is a paradoxical lucidity immediately before death, where there is an unexpected recovery of mental clarity.

== Causes ==
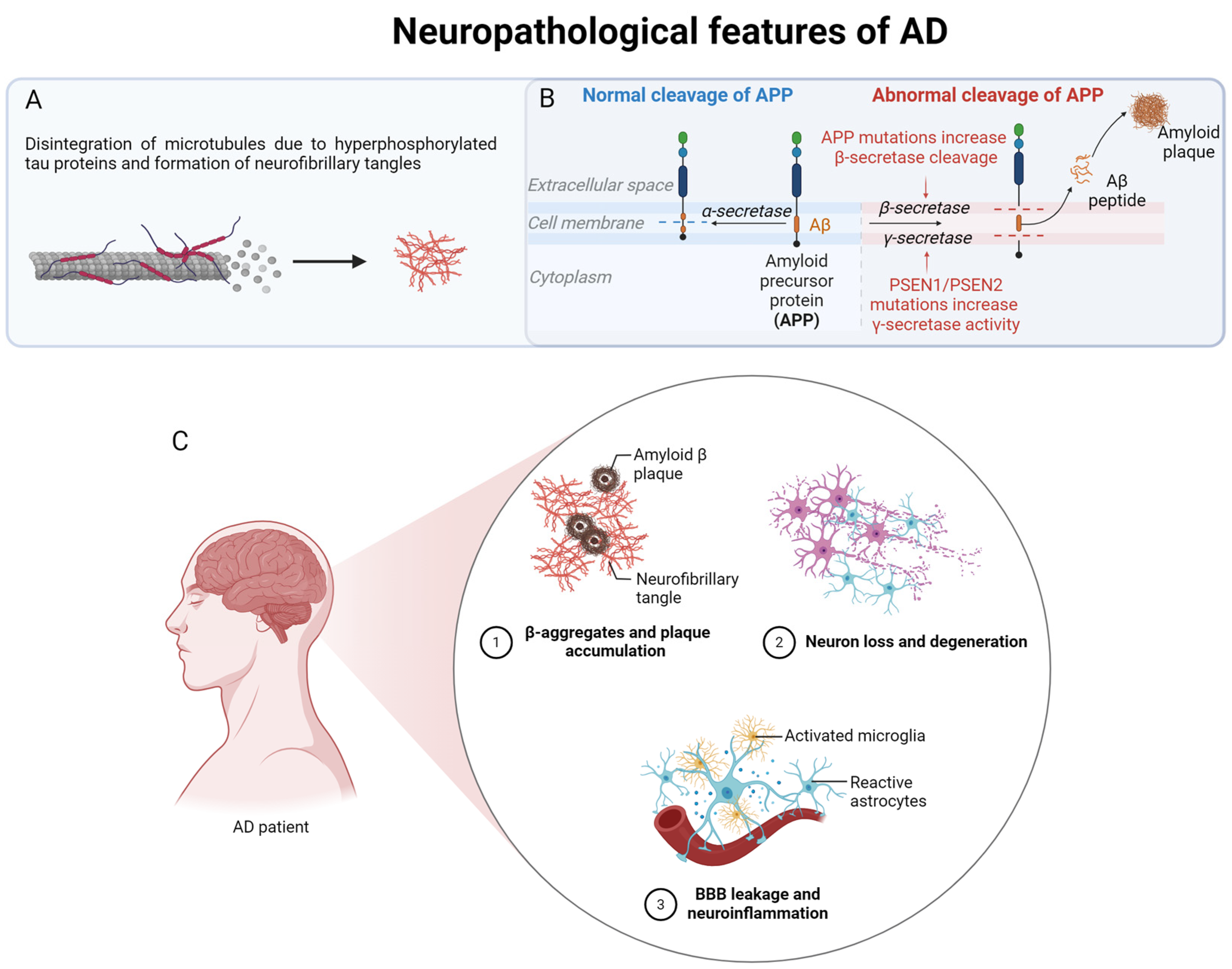
Diagram showing the neuropathology of Alzheimer's disease

Alzheimer's disease is believed to occur when abnormal amounts of amyloid beta (Aβ), accumulating extracellularly as amyloid plaques, or tau proteins, accumulating intracellularly as neurofibrillary tangles, form in the brain, affecting neuronal functioning and connectivity, resulting in a progressive loss of brain function. This altered protein clearance ability is age-related, regulated by brain cholesterol, and associated with other neurodegenerative diseases.

Deterministic causes for most Alzheimer's cases are still mostly unknown, except for 1–2% of cases where deterministic genetic differences have been identified. Predisposing causes (also known as "risk factors") such as hearing impairment and smoking are increasingly documented. Several unifying hypotheses attempt to explain underlying causes; the most predominant are the amyloid beta (Aβ) hypothesis, and the tau hypothesis.

=== Genetic ===
==== Late onset ====
Late-onset Alzheimer's is about 70% heritable. Most cases of Alzheimer's are not familial, and so they are termed sporadic Alzheimer's disease. Of the cases of sporadic Alzheimer's disease, most are classified as late onset where they are developed after the age of 65 years.

The strongest genetic risk factor for sporadic Alzheimer's disease is APOEε4. APOEε4 is one of the three major alleles of apolipoprotein E (APOE). APOE plays a major role in lipid-binding proteins in lipoprotein particles and the ε4 allele disrupts this function. Between 40% and 80% of people with Alzheimer's disease possess at least one APOEε4 allele. The APOEε4 allele increases the risk of the disease by three times in heterozygotes and by 15 times in homozygotes. Like many human diseases, environmental effects and genetic modifiers result in incomplete penetrance. For example, Nigerian Yoruba people do not show the relationship between the dose of APOEε4 and incidence or age-of-onset for Alzheimer's disease seen in other human populations.

==== Early onset familial ====
Only 1–2% of Alzheimer's cases are inherited due to autosomal dominant mutations, as Alzheimer's disease is substantially polygenic. When autosomal dominant variants cause the disease, it is known as early-onset familial Alzheimer's disease, which is rarer and tends to progress more rapidly. Less than 5% of sporadic Alzheimer's disease have an earlier onset, and early-onset Alzheimer's is about 90% heritable. Familial Alzheimer's disease usually implies two or more persons affected in one or more generations.

Early onset familial Alzheimer's disease can be attributed to mutations in one of three genes: those encoding amyloid-beta precursor protein (APP) and presenilins PSEN1 and PSEN2. Most mutations in the APP and presenilin genes increase the production of a small protein called amyloid beta (Aβ)42, which is the main component of amyloid plaques. Some of the mutations merely alter the ratio between Aβ42 and the other major forms—particularly Aβ40—without increasing total Aβ levels in the brain. Two other genes associated with autosomal dominant Alzheimer's disease are ABCA7 and SORL1.

Alleles in the TREM2 gene have been associated with a three to five times higher risk of developing early-onset Alzheimer's disease.

A Japanese pedigree of early-onset familial Alzheimer's disease was found to be associated with a deletion mutation of codon 693 of APP. This mutation and its association with Alzheimer's disease was first reported in 2008, and is known as the Osaka mutation. Only homozygotes with this mutation have an increased risk of developing Alzheimer's disease. This mutation accelerates Aβ oligomerization, but the proteins do not form the amyloid fibrils that aggregate into amyloid plaques, suggesting that Aβ oligomerization rather than the fibrils may be the cause of this disease. Mice expressing this mutation have all the usual pathologies of Alzheimer's disease.

=== Hypotheses ===
==== Misfolded protein ====
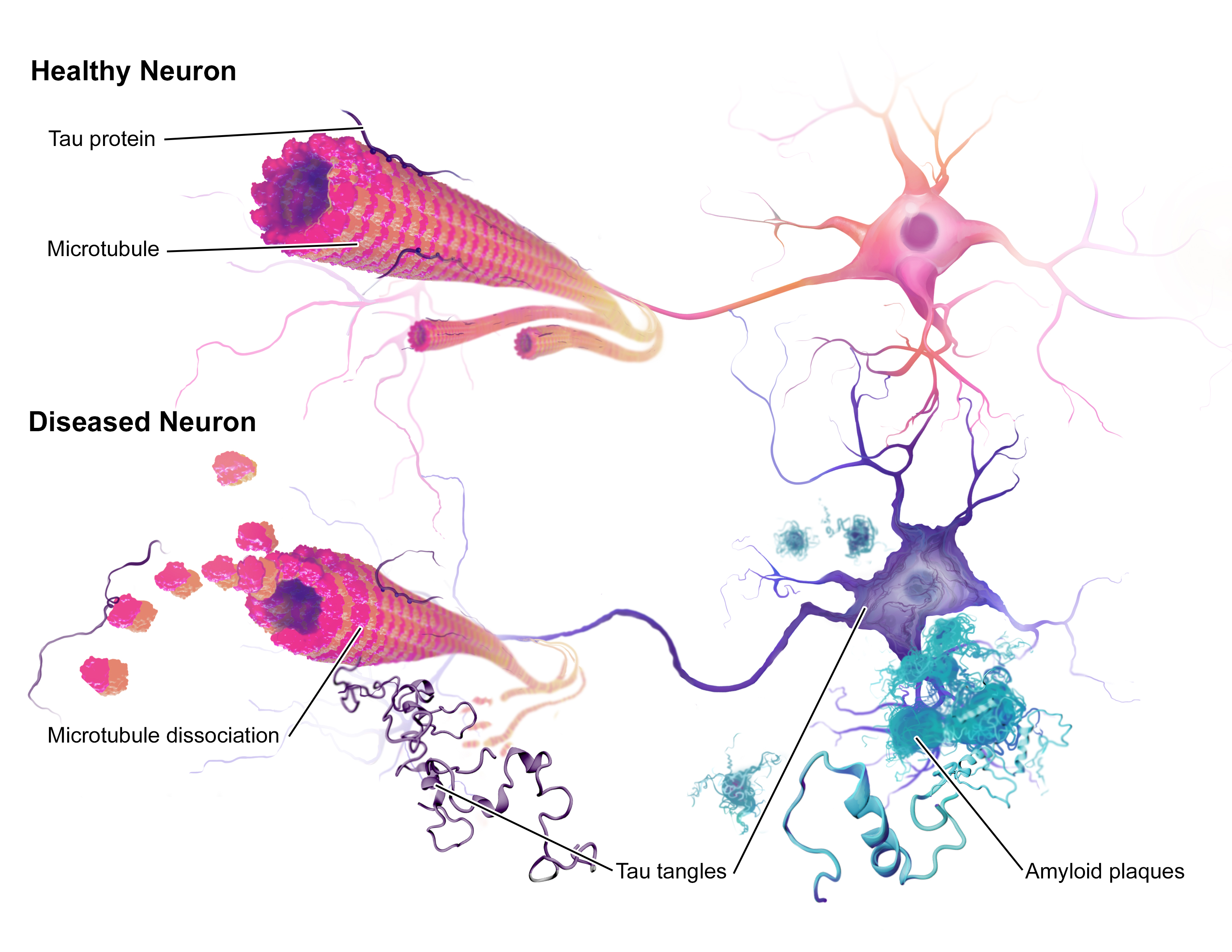
Tau protein abnormalities in neurons may contribute to onset of Alzheimer's disease

Two abnormal proteins define the pathology of Alzheimer's disease: amyloid beta protein (Aβ) in amyloid plaques and tau protein in neurofibrillary tangles. These proteins share two features that promote their ability to cause disease: They both become abnormal by misfolding, that is, by assuming a shape that is rich in beta sheets; and they proliferate in the brain by the prion-like mechanism of seeded protein aggregation. The presence of these abnormal proteins in Alzheimer's disease has spawned two hypotheses of the proteopathic origin of the disease: The amyloid (or Aβ) hypothesis, and the tau hypothesis.

The amyloid hypothesis, also known as the "amyloid cascade hypothesis" or "Aβ cascade hypothesis", holds that the accumulation of misfolded Aβ in the brain is the fundamental cause of Alzheimer's disease. In the amyloid cascade, the buildup of abnormal Aβ leads to tauopathy and eventually the complex degenerative changes of advanced Alzheimer's disease. Abnormal Aβ is thought to damage the brain by directly interacting with cells, as well as indirectly, for example by causing oxidative stress and neuroinflammation.

The amyloid hypothesis is supported by evidence from genetics and biomarkers. All autosomal dominant genetic causes of Alzheimer's disease affect either the amyloid precursor protein (APP) on chromosome 21 or the enzymes that generate Aβ, known as presenilin 1 and presenilin 2. In addition, people with trisomy 21 (Down syndrome), most of whom have an extra copy of the gene for APP, almost universally develop the symptoms and neuropathology of Alzheimer's disease by 40 years of age. Conversely, people with a rare mutation in the APP gene that reduces the production of Aβ and its tendency to aggregate are protected against Alzheimer's disease. Additionally, a major genetic risk factor for Alzheimer's disease is a specific isoform of apolipoprotein E, APOE4. Of the three major isoforms (APOE2, APOE3 and APOE4), APOE4 is linked to the least efficient removal of Aβ by astrocytes, which promotes the buildup of Aβ in the brain. The most efficient clearance of Aβ is achieved by cells bearing the APOE2 isoform, which protects against Alzheimer's disease. Evidence from tests such as imaging of protein deposits in the brain and measurement of brain-derived substances in cerebrospinal fluid and blood implicates abnormalities of Aβ as the earliest and most robust disease-specific change in Alzheimer's disease.

The tau hypothesis proposes that abnormalities of the tau protein initiate the disease cascade, at least in cases of idiopathic Alzheimer's disease. The tau hypothesis is supported by the histopathological findings of Heiko Braak and colleagues that tauopathy can be detected in certain neurons before Aβ plaques are evident. Specifically, Alzheimer's starts with the hyperphosphorylation of tau in specific vulnerable neuronal populations such as the locus coeruleus and projection neurons of the association cortex. There is agreement in the research community that tau contributes strongly to dementia in Alzheimer's disease. Tauopathy occurs in over 30 diseases in addition to Alzheimer's disease. In addition, mutations of the gene for tau (MAPT) cause neurodegenerative disorders known as primary tauopathies, but these diseases occur in the absence of Aβ proteopathy. Current evidence thus favors abnormal Aβ as the prime mover of Alzheimer's disease. However, the Aβ hypothesis and tau hypothesis are not mutually exclusive, in that abnormalities of Aβ initiate the disease and tauopathy is required for its complete expression.

=== Hormonal ===
Because women have a higher incidence of AD than men, it has been thought that estrogen deficiency during menopause is a risk factor. In a 2025 analysis of the Canadian Longitudinal Study on Aging, earlier age at menopause was linked with lower cognitive performance.

==== Infection ====
The possibility that infectious agents cause Alzheimer's disease has been considered since the early 20th century, when Oskar Fischer likened amyloid plaques to small masses (called 'Drusen') of a microbe called actinomyces. Since then, at least 15 different agents, including bacteria, viruses, fungi and protozoa, have been proposed to cause Alzheimer's disease. No definitive evidence has been presented that a specific infectious agent is necessary and sufficient to cause Alzheimer's disease. However, it is possible that microbial infections might act as risk factors for the disease. For example, human herpes viruses such as HSV-1, HHV-6, and HHV-7 have been linked to the risk of Alzheimer's disease. In addition, some pathogens have been reported to seed Aβ deposition in the brain, and aggregated Aβ has antimicrobial properties, suggesting that Aβ plaques might form when brain cells generate Aβ to fight infection. Researchers caution that brain infections can cause dementia by mechanisms unrelated to Alzheimer's disease.

==== DNA damage ====
DNA damage accumulates in affected brains; reactive oxygen species may be the major source of this DNA damage.

==== Cholinergic ====
The cholinergic hypothesis proposes that the loss of neurons in the basal forebrain, which produce the neurotransmitter acetylcholine, is a key event in the pathogenesis of Alzheimer's disease. These cells supply acetylcholine to synapses in the limbic system and cerebral cortex. The cholinergic hypothesis led to the development of drugs that increase acetylcholine in the brains of Alzheimer patients. The efficacy of these agents is limited, probably because many other neurotransmitter systems degenerate in Alzheimer's disease.

==== Sleep ====
Sleep disturbances are seen as a possible risk factor for inflammation in Alzheimer's disease. Sleep disruption was previously only seen as a consequence of Alzheimer's disease, but as of 2020, accumulating evidence suggests that this relationship may be bidirectional.

==== Neuroinflammation, metal toxicity, smoking, and air pollution ====
Systemic markers of the innate immune system are risk factors for late-onset Alzheimer's disease, and misfolded Aβ and tau proteins both are associated with oxidative stress and neuroinflammation. Chronic inflammation also is a feature of other neurodegenerative diseases, including Parkinson's disease, and ALS. The cellular homeostasis of biometals such as ionic copper, iron, and zinc is disrupted in Alzheimer's disease, though it remains unclear whether this is produced by or causes the changes in proteins. Smoking is a significant Alzheimer's disease risk factor. Exposure to air pollution may be a contributing factor to the development of Alzheimer's disease.

==== Age-related myelin decline ====
Retrogenesis is a medical hypothesis that just as the fetus goes through a process of neurodevelopment beginning with neurulation and ending with myelination, the brains of people with Alzheimer's disease go through a reverse neurodegeneration process starting with demyelination and death of axons (white matter) and ending with the death of grey matter. Likewise the hypothesis is, that as infants go through states of cognitive development, people with Alzheimer's disease go through the reverse process of progressive cognitive impairment.

According to one theory, dysfunction of oligodendrocytes and their associated myelin during aging contributes to axon damage, which in turn generates amyloid production and tau hyperphosphorylation. Comorbidities between the demyelinating disease, multiple sclerosis, and Alzheimer's disease have been reported.

==== Other hypotheses ====
The association with celiac disease is unclear, with a 2019 study finding no increase in dementia overall in those with celiac disease, while a 2018 review found an association with several types of dementia, including Alzheimer's disease.

Some studies have reported a potential link between infection with certain viruses and developing Alzheimer's disease later in life, such as COVID-19 or Herpes simplex virus 1 (HSV-1).

Some researchers have proposed that Alzheimer's disease is type 3 diabetes because of a number of correspondences with both type 1 and type 2 diabetes.

== Pathophysiology ==
=== Neuropathology ===
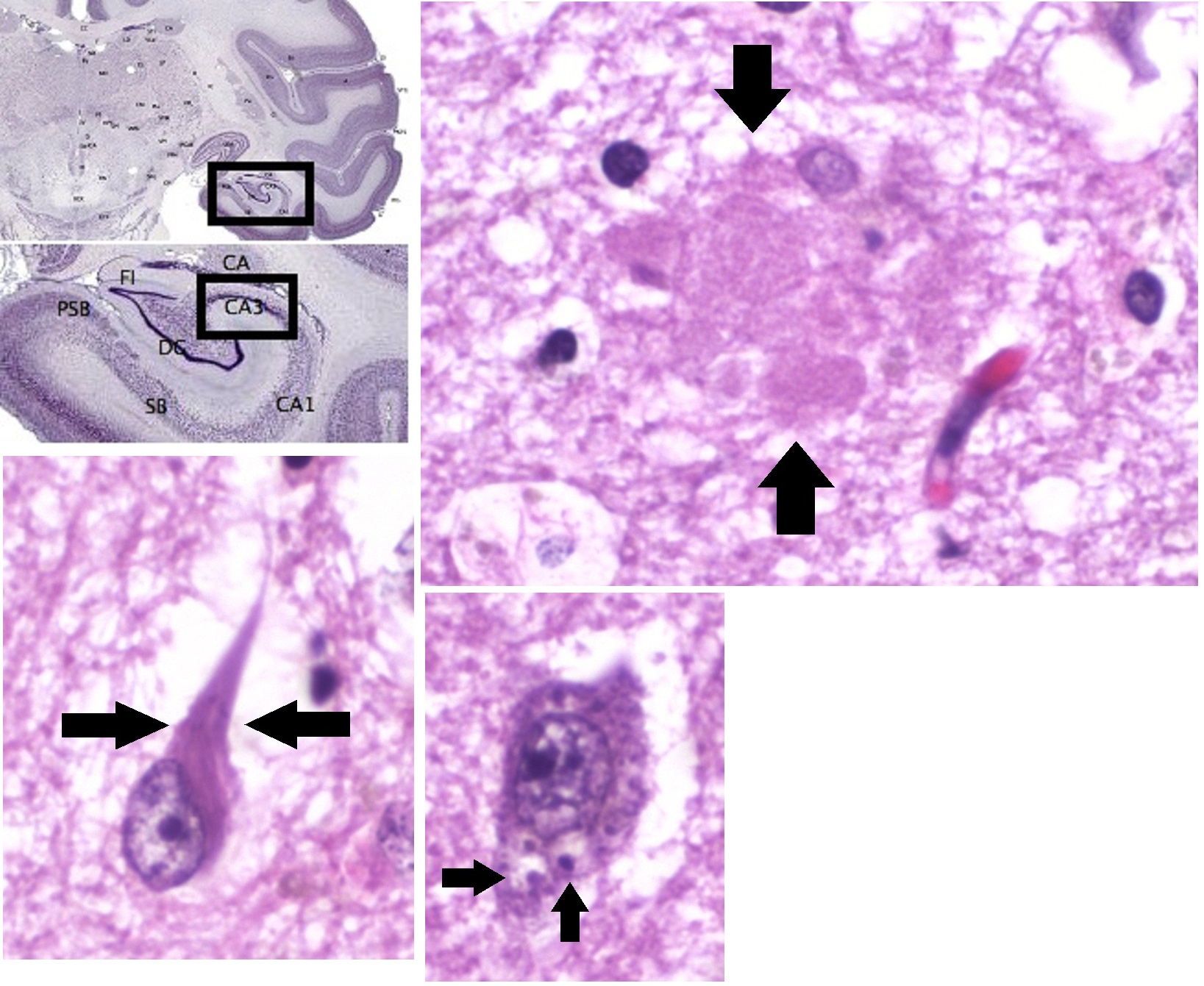
Histopathologic images of Alzheimer's disease, in the CA3 area of the hippocampus, showing an amyloid plaque (top right), neurofibrillary tangles (bottom left), and granulovacuolar degeneration bodies (bottom center)

The gross (macroscopic) appearance of the brain in Alzheimer's disease is variable. In many cases the cortical sulci are widened and the gyri are shrunken, but the degree of cortical atrophy varies. It can sometimes be difficult to discern, particularly in the very elderly. The areas most affected by atrophy are the medial temporal lobe including the hippocampal formation, the amygdala, the frontal lobe and the parietal lobe; the occipital lobe is relatively unaffected by atrophy. The volume of the ventricles increases in parallel with cortical shrinkage. Studies using MRI and PET have documented reductions in the size of specific brain regions in people with Alzheimer's disease as they progress from mild cognitive impairment to Alzheimer's disease, and in comparison with similar images from healthy older adults. These macroscopic changes in the brain are not specific to Alzheimer's and can occur in other disorders and to some extent in normal aging.

At the microscopic level, the defining histopathologic characteristics of Alzheimer's disease are abundant amyloid plaques and neurofibrillary tangles in certain brain regions. Both of these abnormalities are clearly visible by microscopy, and amyloid imaging. In the early stages of disease, tangles are present mainly in the medial temporal lobe and plaques are present mainly in the neocortex, but as the disease progresses the lesions proliferate throughout much of the brain. Although it was once thought that Alzheimer's disease can occur without neurofibrillary tangles in the neocortex, newer methods have shown that dementia in these cases can be linked to a comorbid condition, often Lewy body disease.

Aβ plaques are dense, mostly insoluble deposits of amyloid beta peptide and cellular material outside and around neurons. Neurofibrillary tangles are aggregates of the microtubule-associated protein tau which has become hyperphosphorylated and accumulates inside neurons. Although many older individuals develop some plaques and tangles as a consequence of aging, the brains of people with Alzheimer's disease have a greater number of them in specific brain regions.

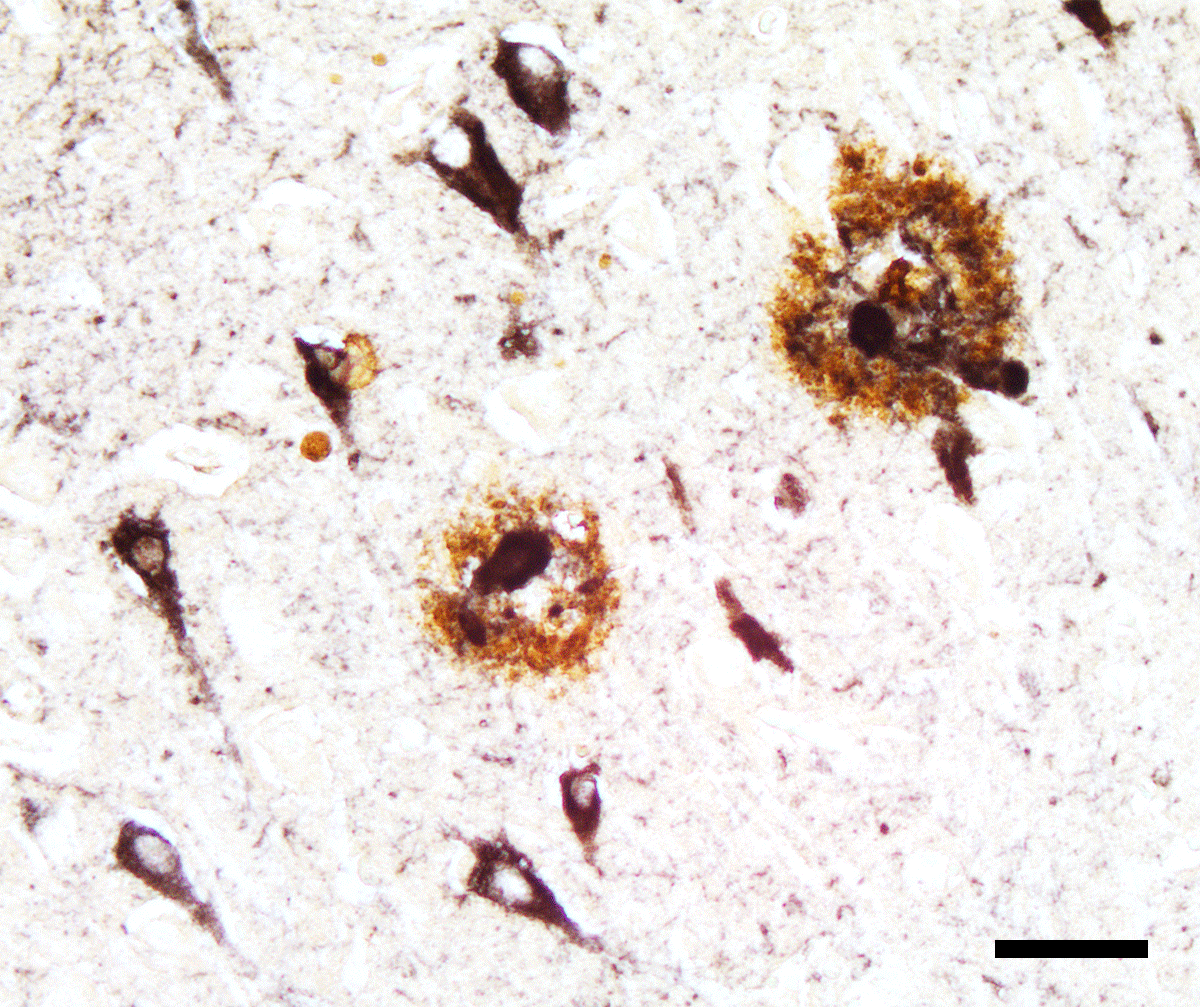
The two defining proteopathies of Alzheimer's disease: Aβ plaques (brown) and neurofibrillary (tau) tangles (black). Abnormal, hyperphosphorylated tau occurs in neuronal cell bodies, in fine neuronal processes throughout the neuropil, and in swollen neurites within the plaques. Dual immunohistochemical stain using antibodies to Aβ and tau proteins. Scale bar = 50 microns (0.05 mm).

In addition to plaques and tangles, other neuropathological changes contribute to the clinicopathological features of advanced Alzheimer's disease. These include cerebral Aβ-amyloid angiopathy (CAA), inflammation, and the loss of neurons and synapses. The disappearance of neurons and their synapses is a particularly prominent correlate of dementia, although not all cells are affected equally. Selective vulnerability - that is, why certain neurons and synapses are affected, and others spared - is an important unanswered question.

In more than half of the cases examined neuropathologically, and especially in very old people, the pathology of Alzheimer's disease is accompanied by lesions that are characteristic of other brain disorders. The most common of these comorbid conditions are vascular disease, Lewy body disease, and TDP-43 proteinopathy. This mixed pathology can complicate both diagnosis and the evaluation of clinical trials, which often target only one of several potential contributors to dementia.

=== Biochemistry ===
==== Amyloid beta (Aβ) ====
Alzheimer's disease has been identified as a protein misfolding disease caused by the accumulation of abnormally folded Aβ protein into amyloid plaques, and tau protein into neurofibrillary tangles in the brain. Plaques are made up of small peptides, 39–43 amino acids in length, called Aβ. Aβ is a fragment derived from the larger Aβ precursor protein (APP), a transmembrane protein that penetrates the cell's membrane. APP is critical to neuronal growth, survival, and post-injury repair. In Alzheimer's disease, the enzymes gamma secretase and beta secretase act together in a proteolytic process that divides APP into smaller fragments. One of these fragments is Aβ, which misfolds and self-assembles into fibrils; these fibrils form clumps that deposit outside neurons in dense formations known as Aβ plaques. Excitatory neurons are known to be major producers of Aβ that contribute to extracellular plaque deposition.

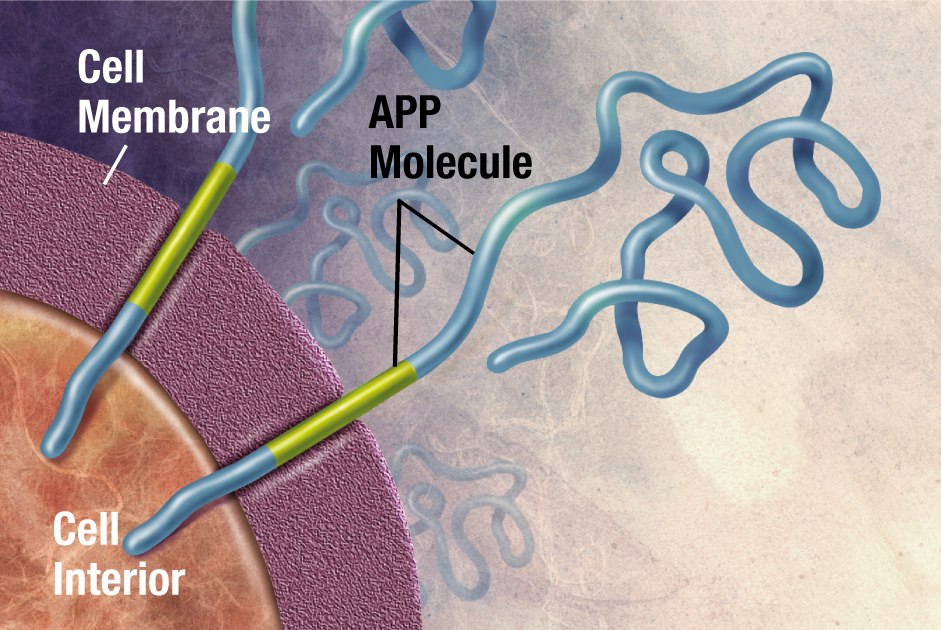
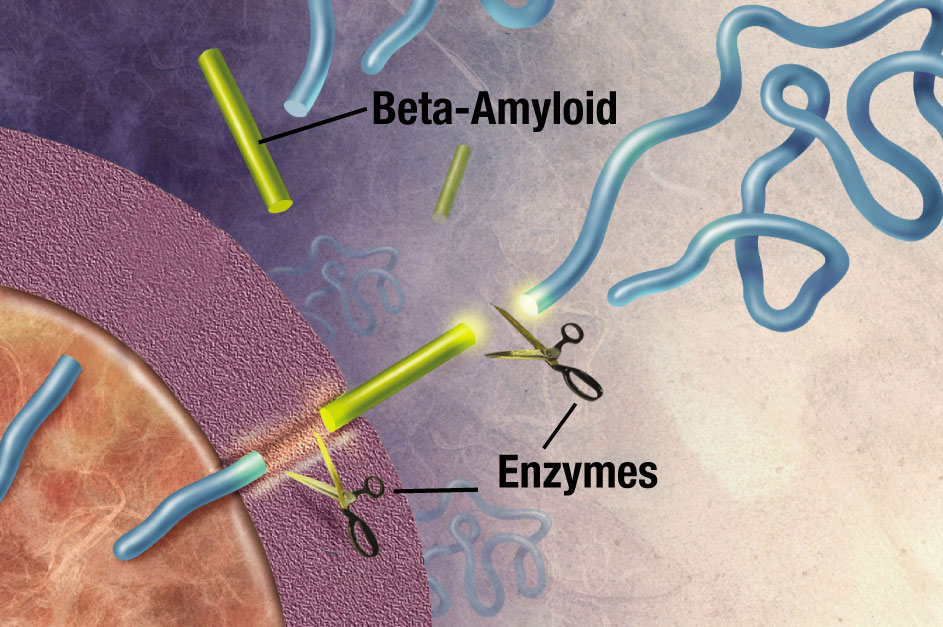
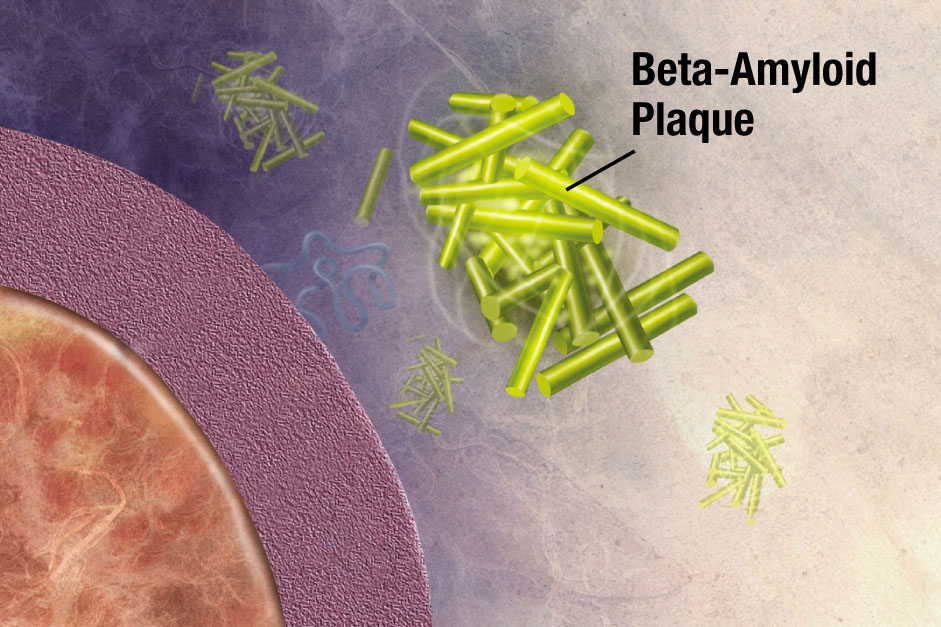
Enzymes act on the amyloid-beta precursor protein and cut it into fragments. The beta-amyloid fragment is crucial in the formation of amyloid plaques in Alzheimer's disease.

==== Phosphorylated tau ====
Alzheimer's disease is also considered a tauopathy due to the abnormal aggregation of the tau protein within cells. Every neuron has a cytoskeleton, an internal support structure partly made up of organelles called microtubules. These microtubules act like tracks, guiding nutrients and molecules from the body of the cell to the ends of the axon and back. The tau protein stabilises the microtubules when phosphorylated, and it is therefore called a microtubule-associated protein. In Alzheimer's disease, tau undergoes chemical changes, becoming hyperphosphorylated; it then begins to pair with other threads, creating neurofibrillary tangles and disintegrating the neuron's transport system. Pathogenic tau can also cause neuronal death through transposable element dysregulation. Necroptosis has also been reported as a mechanism of cell death in brain cells affected with tau tangles.

=== Disease mechanism ===
Exactly how disturbances of production and aggregation of the Aβ peptide give rise to the pathology of Alzheimer's disease is not known. The amyloid hypothesis (also known as the 'amyloid cascade hypothesis') posits that the accumulation of abnormally shaped Aβ peptides is the central event triggering the sequence of changes that eventually lead to neurodegeneration and dementia. Misfolded Aβ accumulates in the brain because it causes normal Aβ molecules to similarly misfold by a prion-like 'seeding' mechanism. The aggregated Aβ takes the form of small oligomers (which are particularly toxic to neurons) and amyloid fibrils, the long polymers that are the main components of Aβ plaques. Some researchers have argued that the amyloid fibrils bind up smaller oligomers and thus protect brain cells from the injurious effects of the oligomers. However, the plaques are not benign inasmuch as they are associated with abnormal neuronal processes and local inflammation. Whatever the relative influence of Aβ oligomers and fibrils, the presence of aggregated Aβ is associated with the disruption of neuronal metabolism and various other changes such as inflammation. Aβ also selectively builds up in mitochondria in the cells of Alzheimer's-affected brains, and it inhibits certain enzyme functions and the utilisation of glucose by neurons.

Evidence supports Aβ as playing a central role in the pathogenesis of Alzheimer's disease. As the disease progresses, the brain undergoes a complex assortment of cellular and molecular changes, including (in addition to tauopathy) inflammation, oxidative/nitrative stress, DNA damage, epigenetic changes, excitotoxicity, endosomal/lysosomal failure, dysproteostasis, autophagy failure, lipid dysmetabolism, calcium ion (Ca2+) dyshomeostasis, post-translational protein modifications, neuronal cell cycle re-entry, mitochondrial failure, cytoskeletal disruption, glucose dysmetabolism, vascular or lymphatic impairments, and biometal dyshomeostasis. Iron dyshomeostasis is linked to disease progression in which an iron-dependent form of regulated cell death called ferroptosis could be involved. Products of lipid peroxidation are also elevated in the Alzheimer's brain compared with controls.

Various inflammatory processes and cytokines also play a role in the pathology of Alzheimer's disease. Inflammation is a general marker of tissue damage in any disease, and may be either secondary to tissue damage in Alzheimer's disease or a marker of an immunological response. Cells that mediate neuroinflammation in Alzheimer's include microglia, astrocytes, oligodendrocytes, lymphocytes and myeloid cells. There is increasing evidence of a strong interaction between neurons and the immunological mechanisms in the brain. Obesity and systemic inflammation may interfere with immunological processes which promote disease progression. Microglia are especially important actors in the Alzheimer's-related inflammation. Microglia are the principal immunological cells of the central nervous system, serving as the tissue-resident macrophages of the brain; they are capable of recognizing and taking up Aβ through multiple pattern recognition receptors, making them central to amyloid clearance within the brain. However, microglia can also be a major source of pro-inflammatory mediators which can be deleterious to neurological function. Microglia are topographically associated with aberrant deposits of tau and Aβ within the brain, even when each pathologic component occurs in distinct brain regions. Microglial activation has been documented in people with mild cognitive impairment, despite a lack of detectable binding of a PET tracer for Aβ in the brain, suggesting that microglial dysfunction may precede plaque deposition as an inciting event in AD.

Alterations in the distribution of different neurotrophic factors and in the expression of their receptors, such as the brain-derived neurotrophic factor (BDNF), have been described in Alzheimer's disease.

By the time the symptoms of Alzheimer's first appear, the complex degenerative mechanisms in the brain have been active for many years. The absent or minor effect on cognitive function of monoclonal antibodies that promote Aβ clearance suggests reconsideration of the amyloid cascade hypothesis.

== Diagnosis ==
Alzheimer's disease (AD) can be definitively diagnosed only with histopathological findings; in the absence of autopsy or brain biopsy, clinical diagnoses of AD are "possible" or "probable", based on other findings. Up to 23% of those clinically diagnosed with AD may be misdiagnosed and may have pathology suggestive of another condition with symptoms that mimic those of AD.

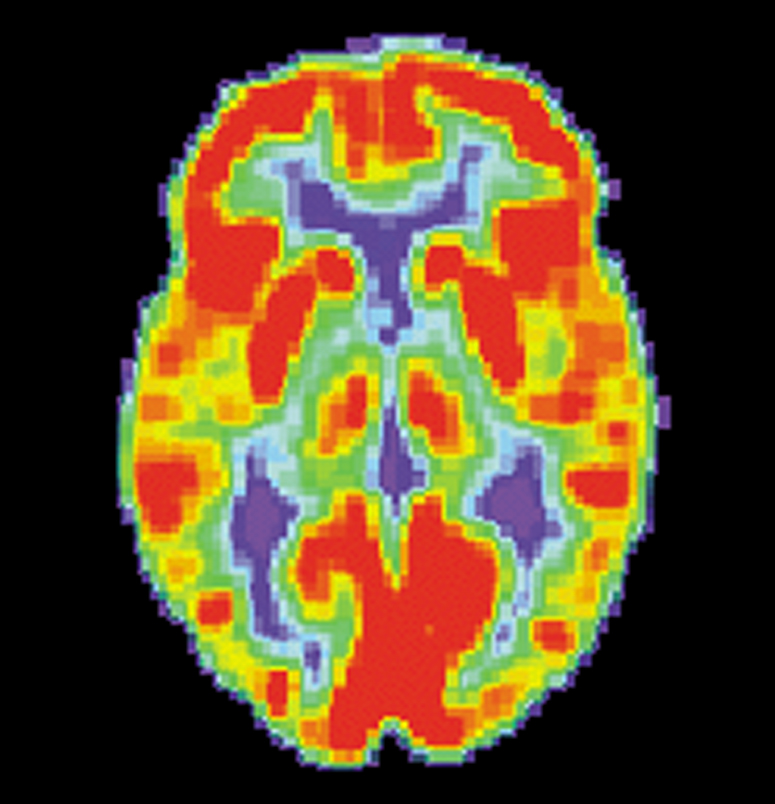
Healthy human brain

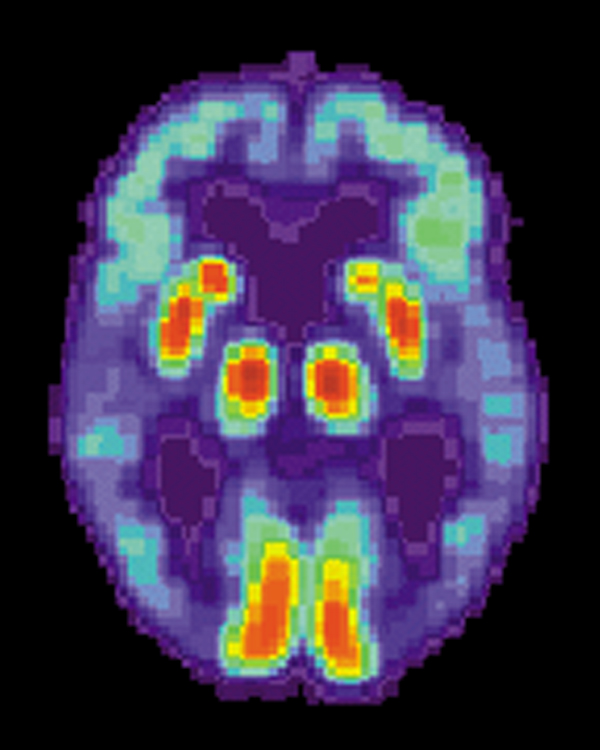
Alzheimer's-affected human brain

PET scans of Alzheimer's-affected brains show substantial reduction in activity.

AD is usually clinically diagnosed based on a person's medical history, observations from friends or relatives, and behavioral changes. The presence of characteristic neuropsychological changes with impairments in at least two cognitive domains that are severe enough to affect a person's functional abilities is required for the diagnosis. Domains that may be impaired include memory (most commonly impaired), language, executive function, visuospatial functioning, or other areas of cognition. The neurocognitive changes must be a decline from a prior level of function, and the diagnosis requires ruling out other common causes of neurocognitive decline. Advanced medical imaging with computed tomography (CT) or magnetic resonance imaging (MRI), and with single-photon emission computed tomography (SPECT) or positron emission tomography (PET), can be used to help exclude other cerebral pathology or subtypes of dementia. On MRI or CT, Alzheimer's disease usually shows a generalised or focal cortical atrophy, which may be asymmetric. Atrophy of the hippocampus is also commonly seen. Brain imaging commonly also shows cerebrovascular disease, most commonly previous strokes (small or large territory strokes), and this is thought to be a contributing cause of many cases of dementia (up to 46% cases of dementia also have cerebrovascular disease on imaging). FDG-PET scan is not required for the diagnosis but it is sometimes used when standard testing is unclear. FDG-PET shows a bilateral, asymmetric, temporal and parietal reduced activity. Advanced imaging may predict conversion from prodromal stages (mild cognitive impairment) to Alzheimer's disease. FDA-approved radiopharmaceutical diagnostic agents used in PET for Alzheimer's disease include three that bind to beta amyloid: florbetapir (2012); flutemetamol (2013); and florbetaben (2014); and one that binds to tau protein, flortaucipir (2020). Because many insurance companies in the United States do not cover this test, its use in clinical practice is largely limited to clinical trials as of 2018.

Assessment of intellectual functioning, including memory testing, can further characterise the disease state. Medical organizations have created diagnostic criteria to ease and standardise the diagnostic process for practising physicians. Definitive diagnosis can only be confirmed when brain material is available, usually post-mortem, and can be examined histologically for senile plaques and neurofibrillary tangles.

=== Criteria ===
There are three sets of criteria for the clinical diagnoses of the spectrum of Alzheimer's disease: the 2013 fifth edition of the Diagnostic and Statistical Manual of Mental Disorders (DSM-5); the National Institute on Aging-Alzheimer's Association (NIA-AA) definition as revised in 2011; and the International Working Group criteria as revised in 2010.

Eight intellectual domains are most commonly impaired in AD—memory, language, perceptual skills, attention, motor skills, orientation, problem solving and executive functional abilities, as listed in the fourth text revision of the DSM (DSM-IV-TR).

The DSM-5 defines criteria for probable or possible AD for both major and mild neurocognitive disorders. Major or mild neurocognitive disorder must be present along with at least one cognitive deficit for a diagnosis of either probable or possible AD. For major neurocognitive disorder due to AD, probable Alzheimer's disease can be diagnosed if the individual has genetic evidence of AD or if two or more acquired cognitive deficits, and a functional disability that is not from another disorder, are present. Otherwise, possible AD can be diagnosed as the diagnosis follows an atypical route. For mild neurocognitive disorder due to AD, probable Alzheimer's disease can be diagnosed if there is genetic evidence, whereas possible AD can be met if all of the following are present: no genetic evidence, decline in both learning and memory, two or more cognitive deficits, and a functional disability not from another disorder.

The NIA-AA criteria are used mainly in research rather than in clinical assessments. They define AD through three major stages: preclinical, mild cognitive impairment (MCI), and Alzheimer's dementia. Diagnosis in the preclinical stage is complex and focuses on asymptomatic individuals; the latter two stages describe individuals experiencing symptoms, along with biomarkers, predominantly those for neuronal injury (mainly tau-related) and amyloid beta deposition. The core clinical criteria itself rests on the presence of cognitive impairment without the presence of comorbidities. The third stage is divided into probable and possible AD dementia. In probable AD dementia there is steady impairment of cognition over time and a memory-related or non-memory-related cognitive dysfunction. In possible AD dementia, another causal disease such as cerebrovascular disease is present.

=== Techniques ===
Cognitive tests such as the mini–mental state examination (MMSE) can help diagnose Alzheimer's disease. In this test, instructions are given to copy drawings like the one reported, remember some words, read, and subtract numbers serially.

Neuropsychological tests including cognitive tests such as the mini–mental state examination (MMSE), the Montreal Cognitive Assessment (MoCA) and the Mini-Cog are widely used to aid in diagnosis of the cognitive impairments in AD. These tests may not always be accurate, as they lack sensitivity to mild cognitive impairment, and can be biased by language or attention problems; more comprehensive test arrays are necessary for high reliability of results, particularly in the earliest stages of the disease.

Further neurological examinations are crucial in the differential diagnosis of Alzheimer's disease and other diseases. Interviews with family members are used in assessment, and caregivers can supply important information on daily living abilities and on the decrease in the person's mental function. A caregiver's viewpoint is particularly important, since a person with Alzheimer's disease is commonly unaware of their deficits. Many times, families have difficulties in the detection of initial dementia symptoms and may not communicate accurate information to a physician.

Supplemental testing can rule out other potentially treatable diagnoses and help avoid misdiagnoses. Common supplemental tests include blood tests, thyroid function tests, as well as tests to assess vitamin B12 levels, rule out neurosyphilis and rule out metabolic problems (including tests for kidney function, electrolyte levels and for diabetes). MRI or CT scans might also be used to rule out other potential causes of the symptoms – including tumors or strokes. Delirium and depression can be common among individuals and are important to rule out.

Psychological tests for depression are used, since depression can either be concurrent with AD (see Depression of Alzheimer disease), an early sign of cognitive impairment, or even the cause.

Due to low accuracy, the C-PIB-PET scan is not recommended as an early diagnostic tool or for predicting the development of AD when people show signs of mild cognitive impairment (MCI). The use of ^{18}F-FDG PET scans, as a single test, to identify people who may develop Alzheimer's disease is not supported by evidence.

In 2025, the US FDA approved a blood test, Fujirebio Diagnostics' Lumipulse G pTau217/ß-Amyloid 1-42 Plasma Ratio, for the early detection of amyloid plaques associated with AD in adults aged 55 years and older who are exhibiting signs and symptoms of the disease. In 2026, the FDA approved the PrecivityAD2 blood test, which measures the ratios of amyloid beta 42, amyloid beta 40, p-tau217 and total tau217, for those as young as 40.

=== Electrophysiology ===
Electroencephalography (EEG) is not routinely used as a primary test for Alzheimer's disease but may assist in the differential diagnosis of cognitive impairment by helping exclude metabolic encephalopathies, Creutzfeldt–Jakob disease, epileptic disorders, and some atypical dementias. EFNS Quantitative EEG studies consistently demonstrate slowing of the dominant posterior rhythm, increased theta and delta activity, reduced alpha power, and disrupted functional connectivity, changes that correlate with disease severity and cognitive decline. Expert consensus considers resting-state EEG a promising non-invasive test for research, patient stratification, and monitoring in clinical trials, although it is not recommended as a substitute for established imaging or fluid biomarkers.

Event-related potentials (ERPs), particularly the P300 component, have also been extensively investigated. Meta-analyses show significantly reduced P300 amplitude in patients with Alzheimer's disease, while prolonged latency has been reported in many studies, reflecting impaired cognitive processing. Despite these findings, variability between recording protocols has limited the routine clinical use of ERP measures, and they remain primarily research tools.

== Prevention ==
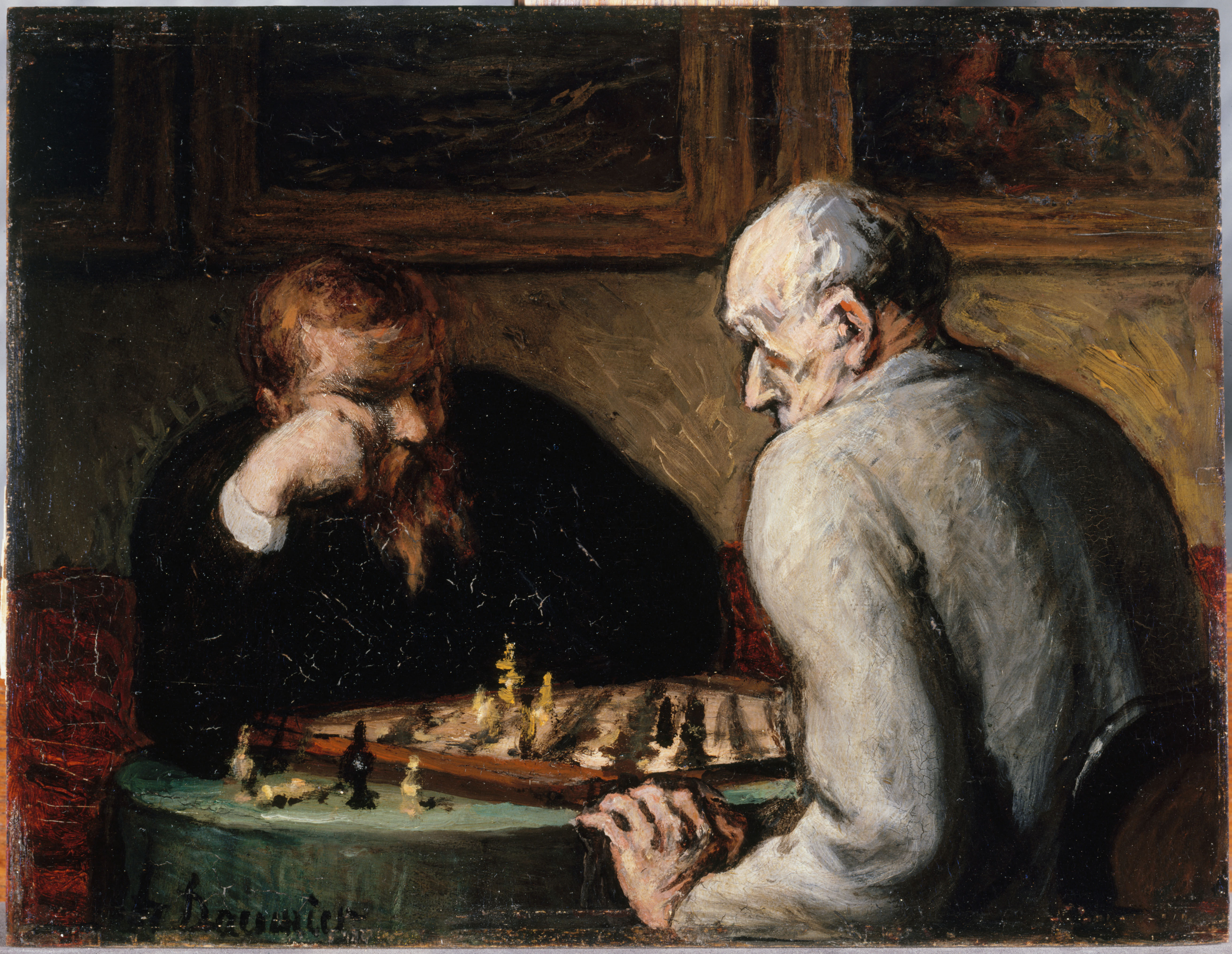
Intellectual activities such as playing chess or regular social interaction have been linked to a reduced risk of Alzheimer's disease in epidemiological studies, although no causal relationship has been found.

There is no disease-modifying treatment proven to cure Alzheimer's disease, and because of this, AD research has focused on interventions to prevent the onset and progression. There is no evidence that supports any particular measure in preventing AD, and studies of measures to prevent the onset or progression have produced inconsistent results. Epidemiological studies have proposed relationships between an individual's likelihood of developing AD and modifiable factors, such as medications, lifestyle, and diet. There are some challenges in determining whether interventions for AD act as a primary prevention method, preventing the disease itself, or a secondary prevention method, identifying the early stages of the disease. These challenges include duration of intervention, different stages of disease at which intervention begins, and lack of standardization of inclusion criteria regarding biomarkers specific for AD. Further research is needed to determine factors that can help prevent AD.

=== Medication ===
Cardiovascular risk factors, such as hypercholesterolaemia, hypertension, diabetes, and smoking, are associated with a higher risk of onset and worsened course of AD. The use of statins to lower cholesterol may be of benefit in AD. Antihypertensive and antidiabetic medications in individuals without overt cognitive impairment may decrease the risk of dementia by influencing cerebrovascular pathology.

Depression is associated with an increased risk for AD; management with antidepressant medications may provide a preventative measure.

Historically, long-term usage of non-steroidal anti-inflammatory drugs (NSAIDs) was thought to be associated with a reduced likelihood of developing AD, as it reduces inflammation. NSAIDs do not appear to be useful as a treatment. Additionally, because women have a higher incidence of AD than men, it was once thought that estrogen deficiency during menopause was a risk factor. There is a lack of evidence to show that hormone replacement therapy (HRT) in menopause decreases the risk of cognitive decline.

=== Lifestyle ===
Certain lifestyle activities, such as physical and cognitive exercises, higher education and occupational attainment, cigarette smoking, stress, sleep, and the management of other comorbidities, including diabetes and hypertension, may affect the risk of developing AD.

Physical exercise is associated with a decreased rate of dementia, and is effective in reducing symptom severity in those with AD. Memory and cognitive functions can be improved with aerobic exercises including brisk walking three times weekly for forty minutes. It may also induce neuroplasticity of the brain. Participating in mental exercises, such as reading, crossword puzzles, and chess have reported potential to be preventive. Meeting the WHO recommendations for physical activity is associated with a lower risk of AD.

Higher education and occupational attainment, and participation in leisure activities, contribute to a reduced risk of developing AD, or of delaying the onset of symptoms. This is compatible with the cognitive reserve theory, which states that some life experiences result in more efficient neural functioning, providing the individual with a cognitive reserve that delays the onset of dementia. Education delays the onset of Alzheimer's disease syndrome without changing the duration of the disease.

Cessation in smoking may reduce the risk of developing AD, specifically in those who carry the APOE ɛ4 allele. The increased oxidative stress caused by smoking results in downstream inflammatory or neurodegenerative processes that may increase risk of developing AD. Avoidance of smoking, counseling and pharmacotherapies to quit smoking are used, and avoidance of environmental tobacco smoke is recommended.

Alzheimer's disease is associated with sleep disorders but the precise relationship is unclear. It was once thought that as people get older, the risk of developing sleep disorders and AD independently increase, but research suggests sleep disorders may be a risk factor for AD. One theory is that the mechanisms to increase clearance of toxic substances, including Aβ, are active during sleep. With decreased sleep, a person is increasing Aβ production and decreasing Aβ clearance, resulting in Aβ accumulation. Receiving adequate sleep (approximately 7–8 hours) every night has become a potential lifestyle intervention to prevent the development of AD.

Stress is a risk factor for the development of AD. The mechanism by which stress predisposes someone to the development of AD is unclear, but it is suggested that lifetime stressors may affect a person's epigenome, leading to an overexpression or underexpression of specific genes. Although the relationship of stress and AD is unclear, strategies to reduce stress and relax the mind may be helpful strategies in preventing the progression or Alzheimer's disease. Meditation, for instance, is a helpful lifestyle change to support cognition and well-being, though further research is needed to assess long-term effects.

== Management ==
There is no cure for Alzheimer's disease; available treatments offer relatively small symptomatic benefits but remain palliative in nature. Treatments can be divided into pharmaceutical, psychosocial, and caregiving.

=== Pharmaceutical ===
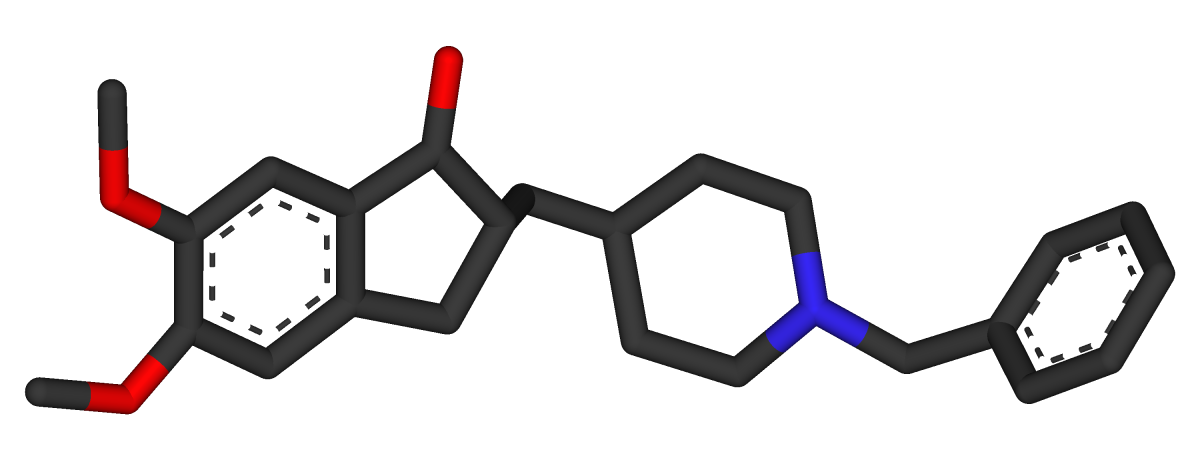
Three-dimensional molecular model of donepezil, an acetylcholinesterase inhibitor used in the treatment of Alzheimer's disease symptoms

Molecular structure of memantine, a medication approved for advanced Alzheimer's disease symptoms

==== Symptomatic treatment ====
Medications used to treat the cognitive symptoms of AD rather than the underlying cause include: four acetylcholinesterase inhibitors (tacrine, rivastigmine, galantamine, and donepezil) and memantine, an NMDA receptor antagonist. The acetylcholinesterase inhibitors are intended for those with mild to severe AD, whereas memantine is intended for those with moderate or severe Alzheimer's disease. The benefit from their use is small.

Reduction in the activity of the cholinergic neurons is a well-known feature of AD. Acetylcholinesterase inhibitors are employed to reduce the rate at which the body breaks down acetylcholine (ACh), thereby increasing the concentration of ACh in the brain and combating the loss of ACh caused by the death of cholinergic neurons. Evidence supports medical efficacy in mild to moderate AD, and somewhat in the advanced stage. This does not extend to delaying symptom onset.

Memantine is a noncompetitive NMDA receptor antagonist first used as an anti-influenza agent. It acts on the glutamatergic system by blocking NMDA receptors and inhibiting their overstimulation by glutamate. Memantine has been reported to have a small benefit in the treatment of moderate to severe AD. The combination of memantine and donepezil has been reported to be "of statistically significant but clinically marginal effectiveness".

An extract of Ginkgo biloba known as EGb 761 has been used for treating AD and other neuropsychiatric disorders. Its use is approved throughout Europe. An umbrella review and a continuing education article differ as to whether it is effective in the treatment of AD.

Atypical antipsychotics are modestly useful in reducing aggression and psychosis in people with AD, but their advantages are offset by serious adverse effects, such as stroke, movement difficulties, or cognitive decline. They are recommended in dementia only after first-line therapies such as behavior modification have failed, and due to the risk of adverse effects, they should be used for the shortest amount of time possible. Stopping antipsychotic use in this group of people appears to be safe.

==== Side effects ====
The most common side effects are nausea and vomiting, both of which are linked to cholinergic excess. These side effects arise in approximately 10–20% of users, are mild to moderate in severity, and can be managed by slowly adjusting medication doses. Less common secondary effects include muscle cramps, decreased heart rate (bradycardia), decreased appetite and weight, and increased gastric acid production. Reported adverse events with memantine are infrequent and mild, including hallucinations, confusion, dizziness, headache, and fatigue.

==== Antibodies ====
Two monoclonal antibodies have been approved to target amyloid beta – donanemab and lecanemab – but as of 2025, their role in treatment is uncertain because of side effects, questions about efficacy, and cost. Lecanemab is approved in the US, including a boxed warning about amyloid-related imaging abnormalities.

A 2026 meta-analysis found that anti-amyloid antibodies have no effect in the treatment of Alzheimer's disease. A 2026 Cochrane review found no effect or at best small effect.

Anti-amyloid antibodies may cause harmful adverse effects and have been shown to slow disease progression only in individuals with "early and mild AD, and cognitive benefits were often marginal."

=== Psychosocial ===
Psychosocial interventions are used as an adjunct to pharmaceutical treatment and can be classified within behavior-, emotion-, cognition- or stimulation-oriented approaches.

Behavioral interventions attempt to identify and reduce the antecedents and consequences of problem behaviors. This approach has not reported success in improving overall functioning, but can help to reduce some specific problem behaviors, such as incontinence. There is a lack of high quality data on the effectiveness of these techniques in other behavior problems such as wandering. Music therapy is effective in reducing behavioral and psychological symptoms.

Emotion-oriented interventions include reminiscence therapy, validation therapy, supportive psychotherapy, sensory integration, also called snoezelen, and simulated presence therapy. A Cochrane review has found no evidence that this is effective. Reminiscence therapy (RT) involves the discussion of past experiences, individually or in groups, many times with the aid of photographs, household items, music and sound recordings, or other familiar items from the past. A 2018 review of the effectiveness of RT found that effects were inconsistent, small in size, and of doubtful clinical significance, and varied by setting. Simulated presence therapy (SPT) is based on attachment theories and involves playing a recording with the voices of the closest relatives of the person with AD. There is partial evidence indicating that SPT may reduce challenging behaviors.

The aim of cognition-oriented treatments, which include reality orientation and cognitive retraining, is the reduction of cognitive deficits. Reality orientation consists of the presentation of information about time, place, or person to ease the understanding of the person about his or her surroundings and his or her place in them. On the other hand, cognitive retraining tries to improve impaired capacities by exercising mental abilities. Both have reported some efficacy in improving cognitive capacities.

Stimulation-oriented treatments include art, music, and pet therapies, exercise, and any other kind of recreational activities. Stimulation has modest support for improving behavior, mood, and, to a lesser extent, function. Nevertheless, as important as these effects are, the main support for the use of stimulation therapies is the change in the person's routine.

=== Caregiving ===
Caregiving is the ongoing physical, social, emotional support provided to people living with dementia, helping them carry out everyday activities. Since AD has no cure and it gradually renders people incapable of tending to their own needs, caregiving is essentially the treatment and must be carefully managed over the course of the disease.

During the early and moderate stages, modifications to the living environment and lifestyle can increase safety and reduce caretaker burden. Examples of such modifications are the adherence to simplified routines, the placing of safety locks, the labeling of household items to cue the person with the disease or the use of modified daily life objects. Per the American Academy of Family Physicians, the use of physical restraints is discouraged. Use of the "VIPS" framework "(Valuing people, Individualised care, Personal perspectives, Social environment)" has been shown to reduce hours per day of restraint. If eating becomes problematic, food will need to be prepared in smaller pieces or even puréed. When swallowing difficulties arise, the use of feeding tubes may be required. In such cases, the medical efficacy and ethics of continuing feeding is an important consideration of the caregivers and family members.

During the final stages of the disease, treatment is centred on relieving discomfort until death, often with the help of hospice.

The wellbeing of caregivers themselves is an important aspect of AD caregiving. Long-term informal caregiving is associated with wide-ranging impacts on physical and mental health and on financial circumstances, collectively described as caregiver burden. A range of interventions can help alleviate burden and improve caregiver wellbeing. Effective measures include complementary formal services, training and psychoeducation, psychological therapies such as cognitive behavioural therapy, and support groups.

=== Diet ===
Diet may be a modifiable risk factor for the development of Alzheimer's disease, but more research needs to be conducted. The Mediterranean diet, and the DASH diet are both associated with less cognitive decline. A different approach has been to incorporate elements of both of these diets into one known as the MIND diet. Results from large-scale epidemiological studies and clinical trials have not demonstrated an independent role for most individual dietary components.

== Prognosis ==
The early stages of AD are difficult to diagnose. A definitive diagnosis is usually made once cognitive impairment compromises daily living activities, although the person may still be living independently. The symptoms will progress from mild cognitive problems, such as memory loss, through increasing stages of cognitive and non-cognitive disturbances, eliminating any possibility of independent living, especially in the late stages of the disease.

Life expectancy of people with AD is reduced. The normal life expectancy for 60 to 70-year-olds is 23 to 15 years; for 90-year-olds, it is 4.5 years. Following AD diagnosis it ranges from 7 to 10 years for those in their 60s and early 70s (a loss of 13 to 8 years), to only about 3 years or less (a loss of 1.5 years) for those in their 90s.

As of 1995, fewer than 3% of people lived more than fourteen years after diagnosis. Disease features significantly associated with reduced survival are increased severity of cognitive impairment, decreased functional level, disturbances in the neurological examination, history of falls, malnutrition, dehydration and weight loss. Other coincident diseases such as heart problems, diabetes, or history of alcohol abuse are also related with shortened survival. While the earlier the age at onset the higher the total survival years, life expectancy is particularly reduced when compared to the healthy population among those who are younger.

Men have a less favorable survival prognosis than women, even after controlling for age and some medical conditions. As of 2025, the reasons for the higher mortality in men are unknown. It has been speculated that men have different dementia risk factors than women, like traumatic brain injury.

Aspiration pneumonia is the most frequent immediate cause of death brought by AD. While the reasons behind the lower prevalence of cancer in AD patients remain unclear, some researchers hypothesize that biological mechanisms shared by both diseases might play a role. However, this requires further investigation.

== Epidemiology ==
Death rate from alzheimers

In 2020, there were approximately 50 million people worldwide with Alzheimer's disease. The prevalence of AD in populations is dependent upon factors including incidence and survival. Since the incidence of AD increases with age, prevalence depends on the mean age of the population for which prevalence is given. Prevalence rates in less developed regions around the globe are lower. Both the prevalence and incidence rates of AD are steadily increasing, and the prevalence rate is estimated to triple by 2050 reaching 152 million, compared to the 50 million people with AD globally in 2020.

Regarding incidence, where a disease-free population is followed over the years have shown rates between 10 and 15 per thousand person-years for all dementias and 5–8 for AD in Spain and Italy, which means that half of new dementia cases each year are Alzheimer's disease. Advancing age is a primary risk factor for the disease, and incidence rates are not equal for all ages: every 5 years after the age of 65, the risk of acquiring the disease approximately doubles, increasing from 3 to as much as 69 per thousand person-years.

=== Sex difference ===
Women with AD are more common than men. This difference has been thought to be due to women's longer life spans. According to one study, when adjusted for age, both sexes were affected by Alzheimer's at equal rates. However, many studies have found even higher age-adjusted numbers for women, including the Framingham study which found women to have almost twice the lifetime risk of men.

As of 2025, it is unknown why women are more commonly affected by AD, although many theories exist, as mentioned in the section on causes above. There are also observable differences in the disease course, as tau protein accumulates faster in women than in men. Also, presence of APOE4 increases AD risk more in women than in men. Even if the same amount of AD pathology observed in a woman compared to a man, there is greater cognitive decline in a woman.

This is relevant for therapy, like the timing of anti-tau treatments or menopausal hormone therapy: In the Canadian Longitudinal Study of Aging, women on MHT had higher memory scores than those who were not on MHT.

=== Ethnicity ===
In the United States, the risk of dying from AD in 2010 was 26% higher among the non-Hispanic white population than among the non-Hispanic black population, and the Hispanic population had a 30% lower risk than the non-Hispanic white population. However, much AD research remains to be done in minority groups, such as the African American, East Asian, and Hispanic/Latino populations. Studies have reported that these groups are underrepresented in clinical trials and do not have the same risk of developing AD when carrying certain genetic risk factors (i.e. APOE4), compared to their caucasian counterparts.

=== By country ===
==== United States ====
In the United States in 2020, AD dementia prevalence was estimated to be 5.3% for those in the 60–74 age group, with the rate increasing to 13.8% in the 74–84 group and to 34.6% in those greater than 85.

==== United Kingdom ====
Estimates show that in 2024 there were nearly a million people living with AD and other dementias in the UK, with more than 800,000 in England. This is expected to rise to 1.4 million by 2040.

In 2022 and 2023, dementia was the leading cause of death in England and Wales.

== History ==
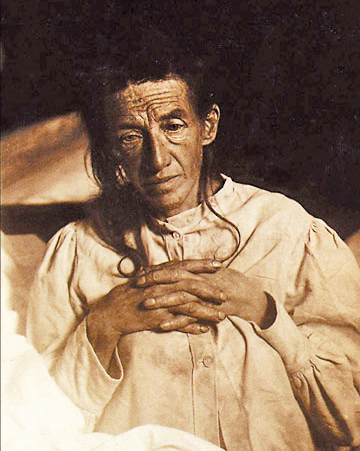
Alois Alzheimer's patient Auguste Deter in 1902. Hers was the first described case of what became known as Alzheimer's disease.

The ancient Greek and Roman philosophers and physicians associated old age with increasing dementia. It was not until 1901 that German psychiatrist Alois Alzheimer identified the first case of what became known as Alzheimer's disease, named after him, in a fifty-year-old woman he called Auguste D. He followed her case until she died in 1906, when he first reported publicly on it. During the next five years, eleven similar cases were reported in the medical literature, some of them already using the term Alzheimer's disease. The disease was first described as a distinctive disease by Emil Kraepelin after suppressing some of the clinical (delusions and hallucinations) and pathological (arteriosclerotic changes) features contained in the original report of Auguste D. He included Alzheimer's disease, also named presenile dementia by Kraepelin, as a subtype of senile dementia in the eighth edition of his Textbook of Psychiatry, published on 15 July 1910.

For most of the 20th century, the diagnosis of Alzheimer's disease was reserved for individuals between the ages of 45 and 65 who developed symptoms of dementia. The terminology changed after 1977 when a conference on Alzheimer's disease concluded that the clinical and pathological manifestations of presenile and senile dementia were almost identical, although the authors also added that this did not rule out the possibility that they had different causes. This eventually led to the diagnosis of Alzheimer's disease independent of age. The term senile dementia of the Alzheimer type (SDAT) was used for a time to describe the condition in those over 65, with classical Alzheimer's disease being used to describe those who were younger. Eventually, the term Alzheimer's disease was formally adopted in medical nomenclature to describe individuals of all ages with a characteristic common symptom pattern, disease course, and neuropathology.

The National Institute of Neurological and Communicative Disorders and Stroke (NINCDS) and the Alzheimer's Disease and Related Disorders Association (ADRDA, now known as the Alzheimer's Association) established the most commonly used NINCDS-ADRDA Alzheimer's Criteria for diagnosis in 1984, extensively updated in 2007. These criteria require that the presence of cognitive impairment, and a suspected dementia syndrome, be confirmed by neuropsychological testing for a clinical diagnosis of possible or probable Alzheimer's disease. A histopathologic confirmation including a microscopic examination of brain tissue is required for a definitive diagnosis. Good statistical reliability and validity have been reported between the diagnostic criteria and definitive histopathological confirmation.

== Society and culture ==
=== Inequalities ===
People living with AD and other forms of dementia and their unpaid carers might face inequalities in access to and the quality of care and support services. These inequalities can depend on various factors, including socio-economic background, housing situation, education level, gender, and race.

People might have differences in how easily they can access AD services based on where they live. On a global level, people in low-and middle-income countries have fewer available facilities and services, and have greater difficulties accessing these than people living in high-income countries. As a result of AD and other forms of dementia being less recognised and treated in the healthcare systems of these countries, the level of awareness of AD as something caused by disease is relatively lower. At the same time, the local socio-cultural understandings of aging, senility, and eldercare may have larger effects on care provision and the reception of medical services.

On a national level, people with AD might have unequal access to care based on where they live. This can manifest on a regional level, with people in rural areas facing more difficulties than those in urban areas. Inequalities can also affect smaller local units as well, for example people living in the same city might receive different or less frequent care based on their postcodes or the street they live in.

Inequalities also affect people with AD from ethnic minority groups. Those coming from a minority background often receive lower quality care, they are less likely to get anti-AD medications compared to their White counterparts. Furthermore, when they are prescribed medication, they are less likely to adhere to the treatment due to various factors and barriers such as the quality of interaction with healthcare providers, distrust in doctors, worries about retaining personal autonomy, stigmas and different beliefs.

=== Social costs ===
Dementia, and specifically Alzheimer's disease, may be among the most costly diseases for societies worldwide. As populations age, these costs will probably increase and become an important social problem and economic burden. Costs associated with AD include direct and indirect medical costs, which vary between countries depending on social care for a person with AD. Direct costs include doctor visits, hospital care, medical treatments, nursing home care, specialised equipment, and household expenses. Indirect costs include the cost of informal care and the loss in productivity of informal caregivers.

In the United States as of 2019, informal (family) care is estimated to constitute nearly three-fourths of caregiving for people with AD at a cost of US$234 billion per year and approximately 18.5 billion hours of care. The cost to society worldwide to care for individuals with AD is projected to increase nearly ten-fold, and reach about US$9.1 trillion by 2050.

Costs for those with more severe dementia or behavioral disturbances are higher and are related to the additional caregiving time to provide physical care.

=== Media ===
Alzheimer's disease has been portrayed in films such as: Iris (2001), based on John Bayley's memoir of his wife Iris Murdoch; The Notebook (2004), based on Nicholas Sparks's 1996 novel of the same name; A Moment to Remember (2004); Thanmathra (2005); Memories of Tomorrow (Ashita no Kioku) (2006), based on Hiroshi Ogiwara's novel of the same name; Away from Her (2006), based on Alice Munro's short story The Bear Came over the Mountain; Still Alice (2014), about a Columbia University professor who has early onset Alzheimer's disease, based on Lisa Genova's 2007 novel of the same name and featuring Julianne Moore in the title role. Documentaries on Alzheimer's disease include Malcolm and Barbara: A Love Story (1999) and Malcolm and Barbara: Love's Farewell (2007), both featuring Malcolm Pointon.

Alzheimer's disease has also been portrayed in music by English musician the Caretaker in releases such as Persistent Repetition of Phrases (2008), An Empty Bliss Beyond This World (2011), and Everywhere at the End of Time (2016–2019). Paintings depicting the disorder include the late works by American artist William Utermohlen, who drew self-portraits from 1995 to 2000 as an experiment of showing his disease through art.

== Research ==
Specific medications that may reduce the risk or progression of Alzheimer's disease include those that impact Aβ plaques, inflammation, APOE, neurotransmitter receptors, neurogenesis, growth factors or hormones.

Machine learning algorithms with electronic health records are studied as a way to predict Alzheimer's disease earlier.

As of 2025, 182 clinical trials were testing 138 drugs against multiple targets.
