= FABP7 =

Protein-coding gene in the species Homo sapiens

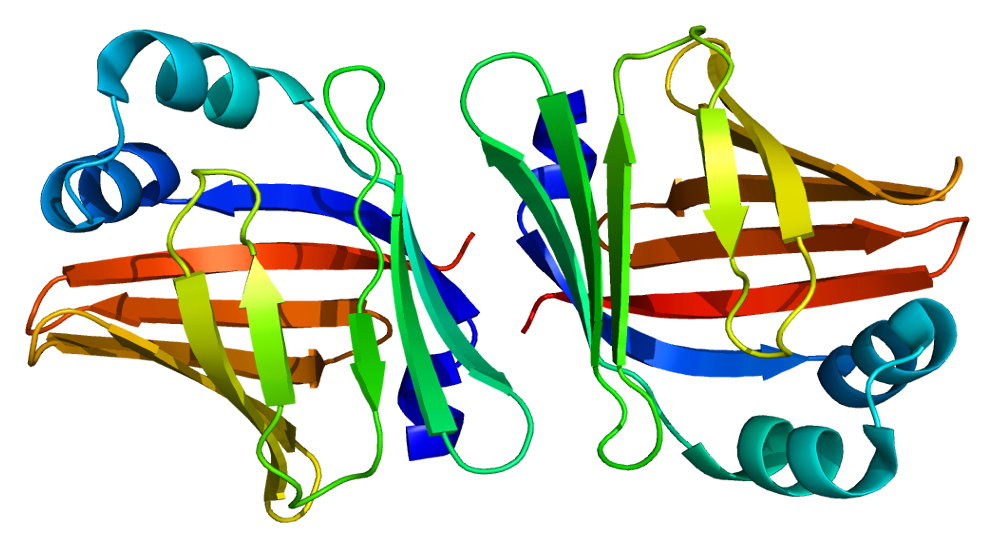

Identifiers
- Aliases: FABP7, B-FABP, BLBP, FABPB, MRG, LTR2-fatty acid binding protein 7
- External IDs: OMIM: 602965; MGI: 101916; GeneCards: FABP7
Available structures
PDB	Ortholog search: PDBe RCSB
PDB	List of PDB id codes 1FDQ, 1FE3, 1JJX

Gene location (Human)
Chr.	Chromosome 6 (human)
Band	6q22.31	Start	122,779,716 bp
Band	6q22.31	End	122,784,074 bp

Gene location (Mouse)
Chr.	Chromosome 10 (mouse)
Band	10|10 B4	Start	57,660,977 bp
Band	10|10 B4	End	57,664,546 bp
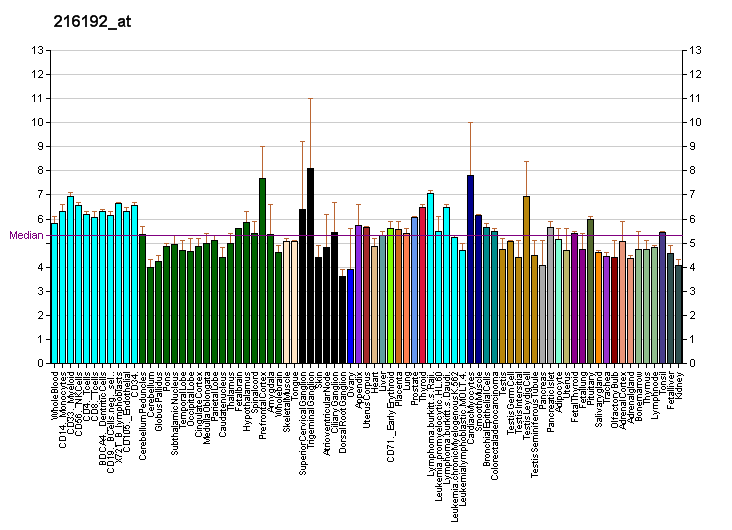

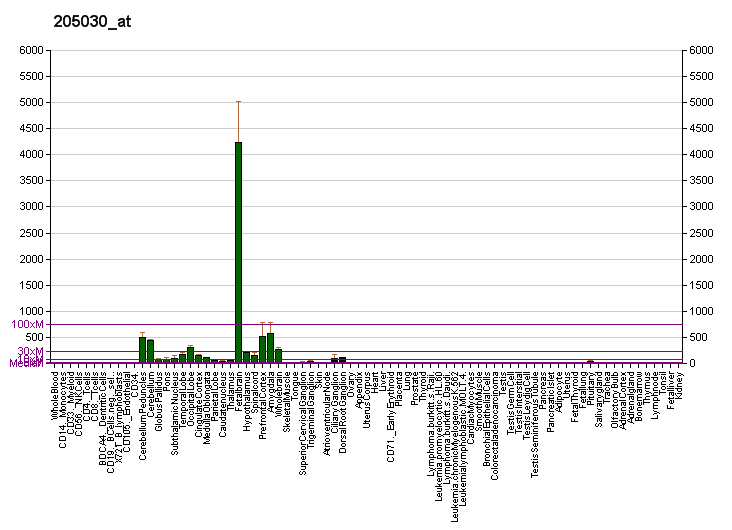

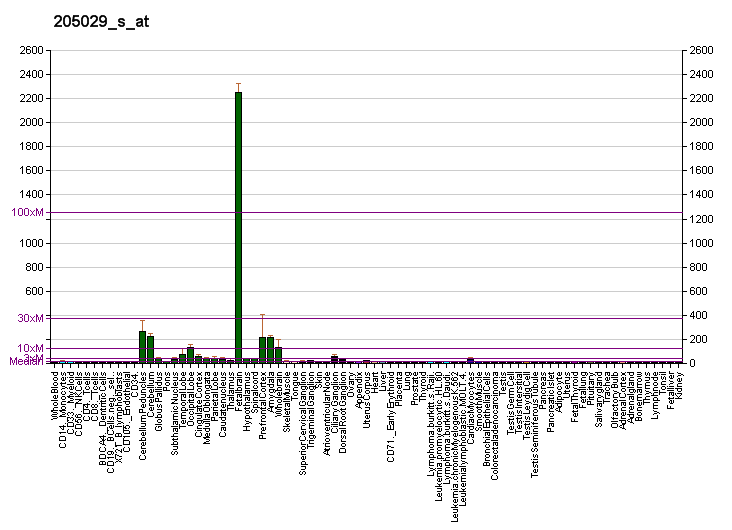
RNA expression pattern
Bgee	Human / Mouse (ortholog); Top expressed in: ventricular zone; ganglionic eminence; cerebellar vermis; spinal ganglia; skin of thigh; cerebellar hemisphere; right hemisphere of cerebellum; paraflocculus of cerebellum; amygdala; vulva / Top expressed in: olfactory bulb; medial ganglionic eminence; ventricular zone; trigeminal ganglion; barrel cortex; optic nerve; superior cervical ganglion; neural tube; olfactory epithelium; fossa; More reference expression data
BioGPS	More reference expression data
Gene ontology
Molecular function	lipid binding
Cellular component	cell body; soma; cell projection; cell periphery; nucleus; cell-cell junction; cytoplasm; cytosol
Biological process	negative regulation of cell population proliferation; triglyceride catabolic process; neurogenesis; epithelial cell proliferation; cell proliferation in forebrain; startle response; nervous system development; prepulse inhibition
Sources:Amigo / QuickGO
Orthologs
Databases	NCBI: entry; OMA: entry
Species	Human	Mouse
Entrez	2173	12140
Ensembl	ENSG00000164434	ENSMUSG00000019874
UniProt	O15540	P51880
RefSeq (mRNA)	NM_001446; NM_001319039; NM_001319041; NM_001319042	NM_021272
RefSeq (protein)	NP_001305968; NP_001305970; NP_001305971; NP_001437	NP_067247
Location (UCSC)	Chr 6: 122.78 – 122.78 Mb	Chr 10: 57.66 – 57.66 Mb
PubMed search
- Wikidata
View/Edit Human	View/Edit Mouse

Fatty acid binding protein 7, brain (FABP7; also brain lipid binding protein, BLBP), is a human gene.

== Function ==
The protein encoded by this gene is a brain fatty acid binding protein. Fatty acid binding proteins (FABPs) are a family of small, highly conserved, cytoplasmic proteins that bind long-chain fatty acids and other hydrophobic ligands. FABPs are thought to play roles in fatty acid uptake, transport, and metabolism.

FABP7 is expressed, during development, in radial glia by the activation of Notch receptors. Reelin was shown to induce FABP7 expression in neural progenitor cells via Notch-1 activation.

According to one study, FABP7 binds DHA with the highest affinity among all of the FABPs.

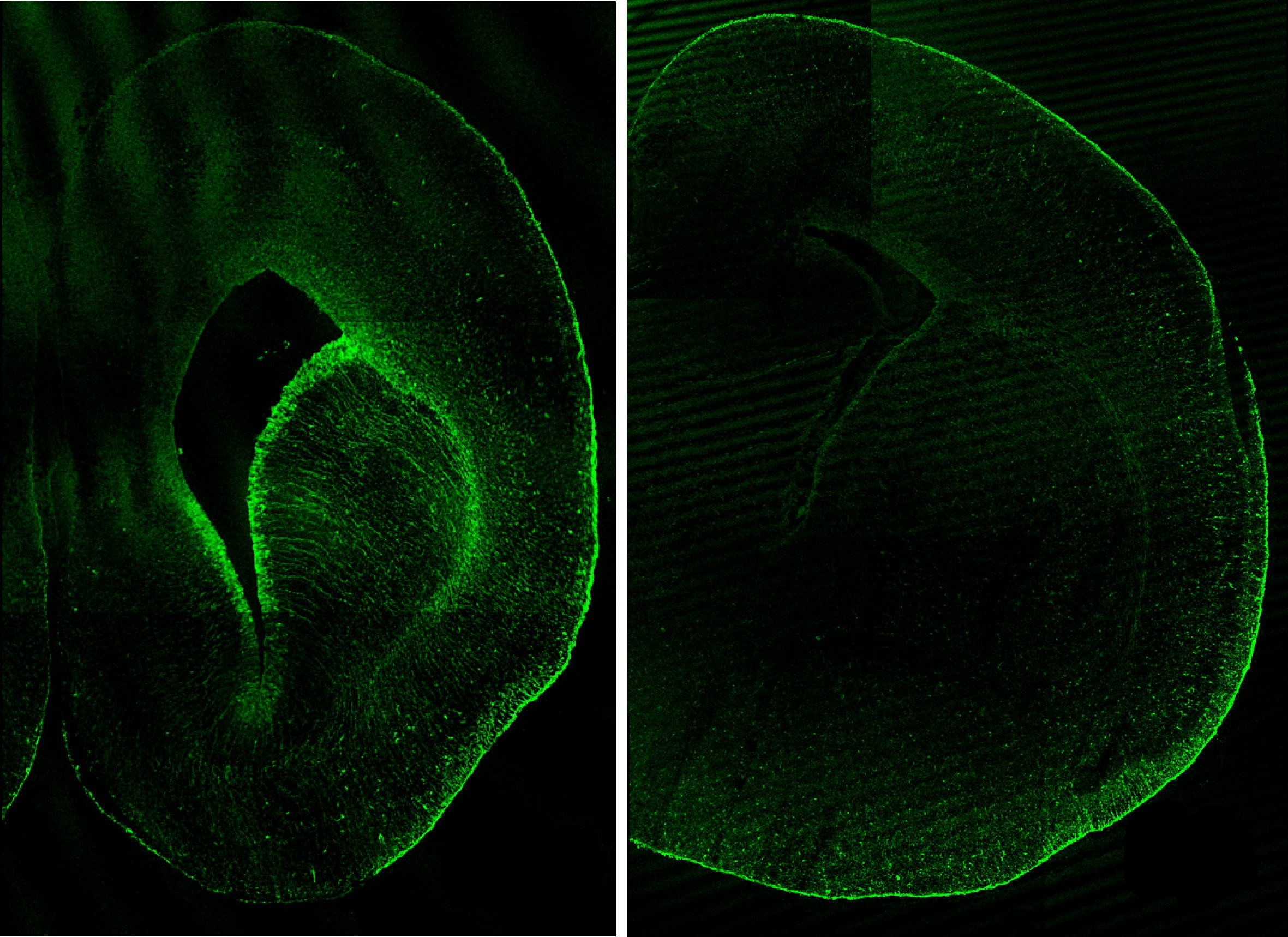
Expression of Fabp7 protein in mouse brains at embryonic day 16 (left) and postnatal day 0 (right). At both stages, Fabp7 is strongly expressed in the ventricular zone and radial glia, where neurogenesis is prominent.

== Role in pathology ==
FABP7 maps onto human chromosome 6q22.31, a schizophrenia linkage region corroborated by a meta-analysis.

As of 2008, two studies have been conducted into FABP7 as a possible risk gene for schizophrenia, with one, that tested for only one SNP, showing negative and another, with seven SNPs, a positive result. The effect of the gene in the latter study was stronger in males. This study also linked FABP7 variation to weak prepulse inhibition in mice; deficit in PPI is an endophenotypic trait observed in schizophrenia patients and their relatives.
