= Reeler domain =

Identifiers
- Symbol: Reeler
- Pfam: PF02014
- InterPro: IPR002861
Available protein structures:
- Pfam: structures / ECOD
- PDB: RCSB PDB; PDBe; PDBj
- PDBsum: structure summary

Reeler domain is a protein domain. Extracellular matrix (ECM) proteins play an important role in early cortical development, specifically in the formation of neural connections and in controlling the cytoarchitecture of the central nervous system. The product of the reeler gene in mouse is reelin, a large extracellular protein secreted by pioneer neurons that coordinates cell positioning during neurodevelopment. F-spondin and mindin are a family of matrix-attached adhesion molecules that share structural similarities and overlapping domains of expression. Both F-spondin and mindin promote adhesion and outgrowth of hippocampal embryonic neurons and bind to a putative receptor(s) expressed on both hippocampal and sensory neurons.

This domain of unknown function is found at the N terminus of reelin and F-spondin.

== Examples ==
Human genes that encode proteins containing the reeler domain include:

FRRS1, RELN, SPON1
