= MAML1 =

Protein-coding gene in the species Homo sapiens

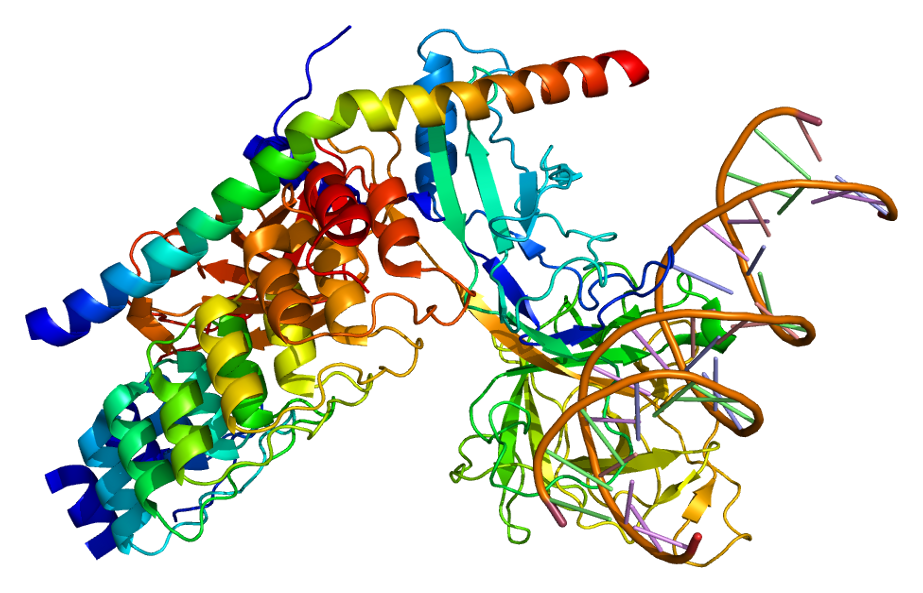

Identifiers
- Aliases: MAML1, Mam-1, Mam1, mastermind like transcriptional coactivator 1
- External IDs: OMIM: 605424; MGI: 1890504; GeneCards: MAML1
Available structures
PDB	Ortholog search: PDBe RCSB
PDB	List of PDB id codes 2F8X, 3NBN, 3V79

Gene location (Human)
Chr.	Chromosome 5 (human)
Band	5q35.3	Start	179,732,822 bp
Band	5q35.3	End	179,777,283 bp

Gene location (Mouse)
Chr.	Chromosome 11 (mouse)
Band	11|11 B1.3	Start	50,146,461 bp
Band	11|11 B1.3	End	50,183,138 bp
RNA expression pattern
Bgee	Human / Mouse (ortholog); Top expressed in: sural nerve; ventricular zone; ganglionic eminence; gallbladder; right hemisphere of cerebellum; gastric mucosa; left uterine tube; rectum; left ovary; stromal cell of endometrium / Top expressed in: left lung lobe; granulocyte; external carotid artery; internal carotid artery; endocardial cushion; vas deferens; genital tubercle; tail of embryo; abdominal wall; fossa; More reference expression data
BioGPS	n/a
Gene ontology
Molecular function	peptide antigen binding; transcription coactivator activity; protein binding; protein kinase binding
Cellular component	nuclear speck; intracellular membrane-bounded organelle; nucleoplasm; nucleus; MAML1-RBP-Jkappa- ICN1 complex
Biological process	Notch signaling pathway; positive regulation of myotube differentiation; atrioventricular node development; regulation of transcription, DNA-templated; positive regulation of muscle cell differentiation; atrioventricular node cell development; transcription, DNA-templated; protein phosphorylation; myoblast differentiation; transcription initiation from RNA polymerase II promoter; positive regulation of transcription by RNA polymerase II; positive regulation of transcription of Notch receptor target; positive regulation of Notch signaling pathway
Sources:Amigo / QuickGO
Orthologs
Databases	NCBI: entry; OMA: entry
Species	Human	Mouse
Entrez	9794	103806
Ensembl	ENSG00000161021	ENSMUSG00000050567
UniProt	Q92585	Q6T264
RefSeq (mRNA)	NM_014757	NM_175334
RefSeq (protein)	NP_055572	NP_780543; NP_001388483
Location (UCSC)	Chr 5: 179.73 – 179.78 Mb	Chr 11: 50.15 – 50.18 Mb
PubMed search
- Wikidata
View/Edit Human	View/Edit Mouse

Mastermind-like protein 1 is a protein that in humans is encoded by the MAML1 gene.

== Function ==
This protein is the human homolog of mastermind, a Drosophila protein that plays a role in the Notch signaling pathway involved in cell-fate determination. There is in vitro evidence that the human homolog forms a complex with the intracellular portion of human Notch receptors and can increase expression of a Notch-induced gene. This evidence supports its proposed function as a transcriptional co-activator in the Notch signaling pathway.

Details on the activity of the N-terminal domain of Mastermind-like protein 1 may be found under MamL-1.

== Interactions ==
MAML1 has been shown to interact with EP300 and NOTCH1.
