= Endophenotype =

Concept in genetic epidemiology

In genetic epidemiology, endophenotype (or intermediate phenotype) is a term used to separate behavioral symptoms into more stable phenotypes with a clear genetic connection. The concept was coined by Bernard John and Kenneth R. Lewis in a 1966 paper attempting to explain the geographic distribution of grasshoppers. They claimed that the particular geographic distribution could not be explained by the obvious and external "exophenotype" of the grasshoppers, but instead must be explained by their microscopic and internal "endophenotype". The concept has gained popularity in research on anxiety and affective disorders.

The next major use of the term was in psychiatric genetics, to bridge the gap between high-level symptom presentation and low-level genetic variability, such as single nucleotide polymorphisms. It is therefore more applicable to more heritable disorders, such as bipolar disorder and schizophrenia. Through their impact on the growth and operation of the vital components of the nervous system, such as neurons, transmitter systems, and neural networks, genes have an impact on complex behavior. Therefore, heritable differences in mental abilities may be caused by changes in the code describing the shape and operation of the underlying neural network. One significant expression of this idea is believed to be the many cognitive deficiencies seen in ADHD, making them ideal candidates for an endophenotype approach. Since then, the concept has expanded to many other fields, such as the study of ADHD, addiction, Alzheimer's disease, obesity and cystic fibrosis. Some other terms which have a similar meaning but do not stress the genetic connection as highly are "intermediate phenotype", "biological marker", "subclinical trait", "vulnerability marker", and "cognitive marker". The strength of an endophenotype is its ability to differentiate between potential diagnoses that present with similar symptoms.

== Definition ==
In psychiatry research, the accepted criteria which a biomarker must fulfill to be called an endophenotype include:

1. An endophenotype must segregate with illness in the population.
2. An endophenotype must be heritable.
3. An endophenotype must not be state-dependent (i.e., manifests whether illness is active or in remission).
4. An endophenotype must co-segregate with illness within families.
5. An endophenotype must be present at a higher rate within affected families than in the population.
6. An endophenotype must be amenable to reliable measurement, and be specific to the illness of interest.

== For schizophrenia ==
In the case of schizophrenia, the overt symptom could be a psychosis, but the underlying phenotypes are, for example, a lack of sensory gating and a decline in working memory. Both of these traits have a clear genetic component and can thus be called endophenotypes. A strong candidate for schizophrenia endophenotype is prepulse inhibition, the ability to inhibit the reaction to startling stimuli. However, several other task-related candidate endophenotypes have been proposed for schizophrenia, and even resting measures extracted from EEG, such as, power of frequency bands and EEG microstates.

Endophenotypes are quantitative, trait-like deficits that are typically assessed by laboratory-based methods rather than by clinical observation.

The four primary criteria for an endophenotype are that it is present in probands with the disorder, that it is not state-related (that is, it does not occur only during clinical episodes) but instead is present early in the disease course and during periods of remission, that it is observed in unaffected family members at a higher rate than in the general population, and that it is heritable. The behavioral syndrome of schizophrenia is no longer thought to be a singular disease with a single underlying cause, as is once again becoming clear. Instead, it could have a number of different etiologies, and the symptoms could have many different origins. Such heterogeneity may explain some of the challenges in determining the genetics of schizophrenia and may also account for the clinical observations of schizophrenia treatment response variability.

Some distinct genes that could underlie certain endophenotypic traits in schizophrenia include:

- RELN – coding the reelin protein downregulated in patients' brains. In one 2008 study, its variants were associated with performance in verbal and visual working memory tests in the nuclear families of patients.
- FABP7, coding the Fatty acid-binding protein 7 (brain), one SNP of which was associated with schizophrenia in one 2008 study, is also linked to prepulse inhibition in mice. It is still uncertain though whether the finding will be replicated for human patients.
- CHRNA7, coding the neuronal nicotinic acetylcholine receptor alpha7 subunit. alpha7-containing receptors are known to improve prepulse inhibition, pre-attentive and attentive states.

== For bipolar disorder ==
In bipolar disorder, one commonly identified endophenotype is a deficit in face emotion labeling, which is found in both individuals with bipolar disorder and in individuals who are "at risk" (i.e., have a first degree relative with bipolar disorder). Using fMRI, this endophenotype has been linked to dysfunction in the dorsolateral and ventrolateral prefrontal cortex, anterior cingulate cortex, striatum, and amygdala. A polymorphism in the CACNA1C gene coding for the voltage-dependent calcium channel Ca_{v}1.2 has been found to be associated with deficits in facial emotion recognition.

== For suicide ==
The endophenotype concept has also been used in suicide studies. Personality characteristics can be viewed as endophenotypes that may exert a diathesis effect on an individual's susceptibility to suicidal behavior. Although the exact identification of these endophenotypes is controversial, certain traits such as impulsivity and aggression are commonly cited risk factors. One such genetic basis for one of these at-risk endophenotypes has been suggested in 2007 to be the gene coding for the serotonin receptor 5-HT_{1B}, known to be relevant in aggressive behaviors.

== See also ==
- Biomarker
