= MamL-1 domain =

MamL-1

Identifiers
- Symbol: MamL-1
- Pfam: PF09596
- InterPro: IPR019082
Available protein structures:
- PDB: IPR019082 PF09596 (ECOD; PDBsum)
- AlphaFold: IPR019082; PF09596

In molecular biology, there are a number of neurogenic proteins referred to as mastermind-like proteins (MAMLs) of which this domain is the N-terminal region. Mastermind-like proteins act as critical transcriptional co-activators for Notch signaling.

== Domain ==
The N-terminal domain of MAML proteins, MAML1, MAML2, MAML3, is a polypeptide of up to 70 residues, numbers 15-67 of which adopt an elongated kinked helix that wraps around ANK and CSL forming one of the complexes in the build-up of the Notch transcriptional complex for recruiting general transcription factors. This N-terminal domain is responsible for its interaction with the ankyrin repeat region of the Notch proteins NOTCH1, NOTCH2, NOTCH3 and NOTCH4. It forms a DNA-binding complex with Notch proteins and RBPSUH/RBP-J kappa/CBF1, and also binds CREBBP/CBP and CDK8. The C-terminal region is required for transcriptional activation.

Notch receptors are cleaved upon ligand engagement and the intracellular domain of Notch shuttles to the nucleus. MAMLs form a functional DNA-binding complex with the cleaved Notch receptor and the transcription factor CSL, thereby regulating transcriptional events that are specific to the Notch pathway. MAML proteins may also play roles as key transcriptional co-activators in other signal transduction pathways as well, including: muscle differentiation and myopathies (MEF2C), tumour suppressor pathway (p53) and colon carcinoma survival (beta-catenin). MAML proteins could mediate cross-talk among the various signaling pathways and the diverse activities of the MAML proteins converge to impact normal biological processes and human diseases, including cancers.
