= Erminio Costa =

- Born: March 9, 1924; Cagliari, Sardinia, Kingdom of Italy
- Died: November 28, 2009 (aged 85); Chevy Chase, Maryland, U.S.
- Citizenship: American
- Education: University of Cagliari
- Known for: Research on serotonin, the GABA receptor, and metabotropic glutamate receptors
- Spouse: Ingeborg Hanbauer
- Children: Michael, Max and Robert (Robert died in 2006)
- Scientific career
- Fields: Neuropharmacology
- Workplaces: Columbia University, Georgetown University

Erminio "Mimo" Costa (March 9, 1924 – November 28, 2009) was an Italian-American neuroscientist. His research interests covered brain serotonergic activity in health and disease, benzodiazepine-GABA interactions, benzodiazepine action at GABAA receptors, neurophysiological role of neurosteroids, and GABAergic dysfunction and changes in the expression of reelin and GAD67 in schizophrenia. He published more than 1,000 articles. The June 2011 issue of the journal Neuropharmacology was dedicated to him.

== Career ==
- July 1947 - M.D. 110/110 cum laude, University of Cagliari, Italy
- 1950-1960 - Thudichum Psychiatric Research Laboratory, Galesburg Research Hospital, Galesburg, Illinois
- 1960-1965 - Deputy Chief, Laboratory of Chemical Pharmacology at NHLI - NIH, Bethesda, Maryland
- 1965-1968 - Associate Professor of Pharmacology and Neurology, College of Physicians and Surgeons of Columbia University, New York, NY
- 1968-1985 - Chief of the Laboratory of Preclinical Pharmacology, NIMH, St. Elizabeths Hospital, Washington, DC
- 1985-1994 - Director and Founder, Institute of Neuroscience, and Professor of Pharmacology, Georgetown University, Washington, DC
- 1994-1995 - Director, Center for Neuropharmacology, Nathan Kline Institute for Psychiatric Research, New York University, New York, NY
- 1995 - Scientific Director, Psychiatric Institute, Professor of Biochemistry in Psychiatry, Department of Psychiatry, College of Medicine, University of Illinois at Chicago, Chicago, Illinois
- 1982 - Member, National Academy of Sciences
- 1991 - Member of "Accademia dei Lincei" founded by Galileo Galilei in 1602, Rome

== Books ==
- Advances in Biochemical Psychopharmacology (1969)
- Biochemistry and Pharmacology of the Basal Ganglia (1966)
- Biochemistry of Simple Neuronal Models (1970)
- Neurosteroids and Brain Function (1991)
- The Endorphins - Vol. 18 (1985)

== See also ==
- Bernard Brodie, in whose laboratory Costa worked for a time.
