= MAML2 =

Protein-coding gene in the species Homo sapiens

Identifiers
- Aliases: MAML2, MAM-3, MAM2, MAM3, MLL-mastermind like transcriptional coactivator 2
- External IDs: OMIM: 607537; GeneCards: MAML2

Gene location (Human)
| Chr. | Chromosome 11 (human) |
| Band | 11q21 | Start | 95,976,598 bp |
| Band | 11q21 | End | 96,343,195 bp |
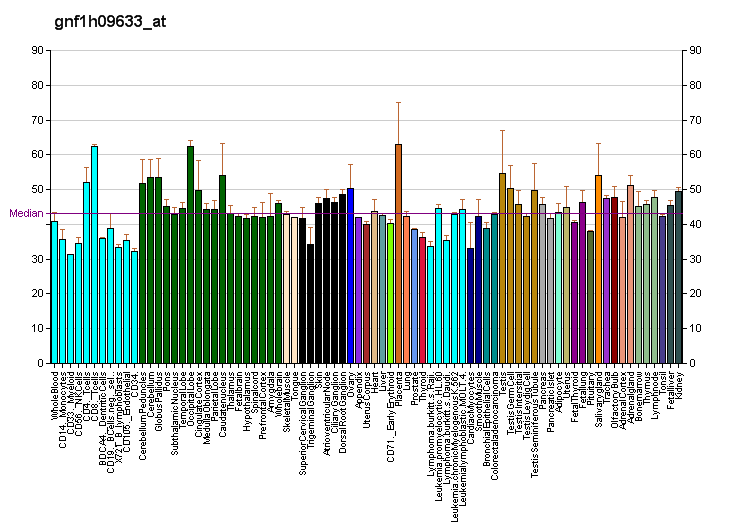
RNA expression pattern
| Bgee | Human / Mouse (ortholog); Top expressed in: mucosa of paranasal sinus; cartilage tissue; lactiferous duct; skin of hip; parietal pleura; bronchial epithelial cell; visceral pleura; renal medulla; mucosa of ileum; synovial membrane / n/a; More reference expression data |
| BioGPS | More reference expression data |
Gene ontology
| Molecular function | transcription coactivator activity |
| Cellular component | nuclear speck; nucleus; nucleoplasm |
| Biological process | Notch signaling pathway; transcription initiation from RNA polymerase II promoter; regulation of transcription, DNA-templated; transcription, DNA-templated; positive regulation of transcription by RNA polymerase II; positive regulation of transcription of Notch receptor target; positive regulation of Notch signaling pathway |
Sources:Amigo / QuickGO
Orthologs
| Databases | NCBI: entry; OMA: entry |
| Species | Human | Mouse |
| Entrez | 84441 | n/a |
| Ensembl | ENSG00000184384 | n/a |
| UniProt | Q8IZL2 | n/a |
| RefSeq (mRNA) | NM_032427 | n/a |
| RefSeq (protein) | NP_115803 | n/a |
| Location (UCSC) | Chr 11: 95.98 – 96.34 Mb | n/a |
| PubMed search | | n/a |
- Wikidata
| View/Edit Human |

Mastermind-like protein 2 is a protein that in humans is encoded by the MAML2 gene.

== See also ==
Details on the activity of the N-terminal domain of Mastermind-like protein 2 may be found under MamL-1.
