= Rs7341475 =

SNP: rs7341475
- Gene: RELN
- Chromosome: 7
- Region: Intron 4

External databases
- Ensembl: Human SNPView
- dbSNP: 7341475
- HapMap: 7341475
- SNPedia: 7341475
- SzGene: Meta-analysis; Overview

In genetics, rs7341475 is a single nucleotide polymorphism (SNP) in the RELN gene that codes the reelin protein. The gene RELN is mapped to human chromosome 7 (7q22.1). The SNP rs7341475 is located in the fourth intron of RELN. The gene RELN has many more SNPs among its 65 exons and 64 introns, — even in intron 4 there are tens of SNPs.

The SNP has been investigated for a possible link to schizophrenia. A 2008 genome-wide association study pointed to that a variant of the SNP could elevate the risk for schizophrenia among women. A 2015 publication reported a meta-analysis across five studies concluding a slight effect of the SNP.
