= Spondin 1 =

Protein-coding gene in the species Homo sapiens

SPON1
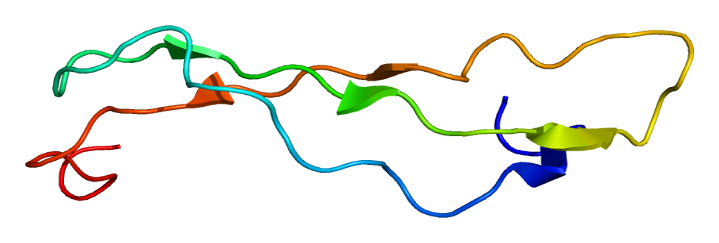

Identifiers
- Aliases: SPON1, VSGP/F-spondin, f-spondin, Spondin 1
- External IDs: OMIM: 604989; MGI: 2385287; GeneCards: SPON1
Available structures
PDB	Ortholog search: PDBe RCSB
PDB	List of PDB id codes 2ZOT, 2ZOU, 3COO, 3Q13

Gene location (Human)
Chr.	Chromosome 11 (human)
Band	11p15.2	Start	13,962,723 bp
Band	11p15.2	End	14,268,133 bp

Gene location (Mouse)
Chr.	Chromosome 7 (mouse)
Band	7|7 F1	Start	113,365,235 bp
Band	7|7 F1	End	113,642,605 bp
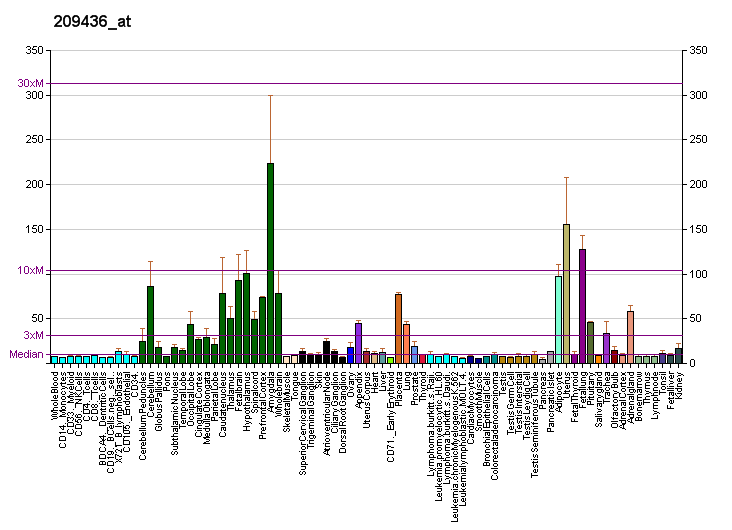

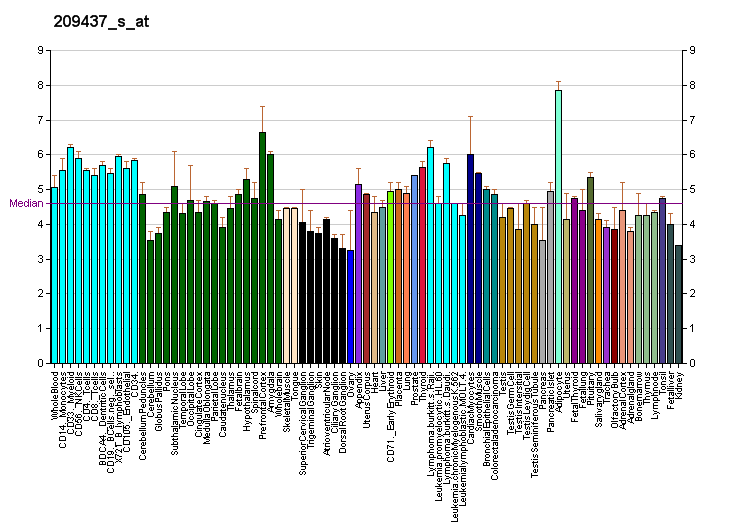

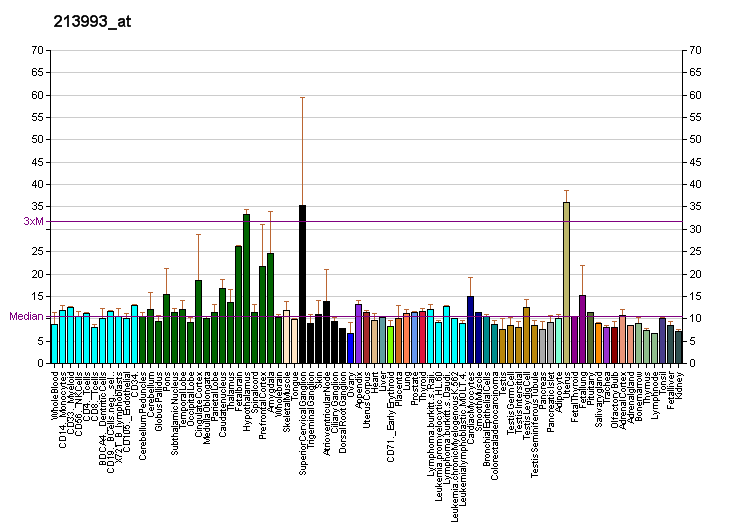
RNA expression pattern
Bgee	Human / Mouse (ortholog); Top expressed in: gallbladder; mucosa of sigmoid colon; pericardium; lower lobe of lung; cardia; mucosa of urinary bladder; external globus pallidus; right lung; visceral pleura; parietal pleura / Top expressed in: epithelium of lens; iris; ciliary body; external carotid artery; cervix; internal carotid artery; retinal pigment epithelium; atrium; decidua; suprachiasmatic nucleus; More reference expression data
BioGPS	More reference expression data
Gene ontology
Molecular function	protein binding; metal ion binding; extracellular matrix structural constituent; LBD domain binding
Cellular component	extracellular matrix; extracellular region; endoplasmic reticulum lumen; extracellular space; collagen-containing extracellular matrix
Biological process	cell adhesion; protein O-linked fucosylation; positive regulation of protein processing; positive regulation of protein binding; negative regulation of amyloid-beta formation; positive regulation of amyloid precursor protein catabolic process
Sources:Amigo / QuickGO
Orthologs
Databases	NCBI: entry; OMA: entry
Species	Human	Mouse
Entrez	10418	233744
Ensembl	ENSG00000262655	ENSMUSG00000038156
UniProt	Q9HCB6	Q8VCC9
RefSeq (mRNA)	NM_006108	NM_145584
RefSeq (protein)	NP_006099	NP_663559
Location (UCSC)	Chr 11: 13.96 – 14.27 Mb	Chr 7: 113.37 – 113.64 Mb
PubMed search
- Wikidata
View/Edit Human	View/Edit Mouse

Spondin-1 (also known as F-spondin) is a protein that in humans is encoded by the SPON1 gene. It is secreted by cells of the floor plate and may be involved in axon guidance The protein contains 807 amino acids and is structurally composed of six thrombospondin domains, one reelin domain, and one spondin domain.
