= Notch 1 =

Protein found in humans

NOTCH1
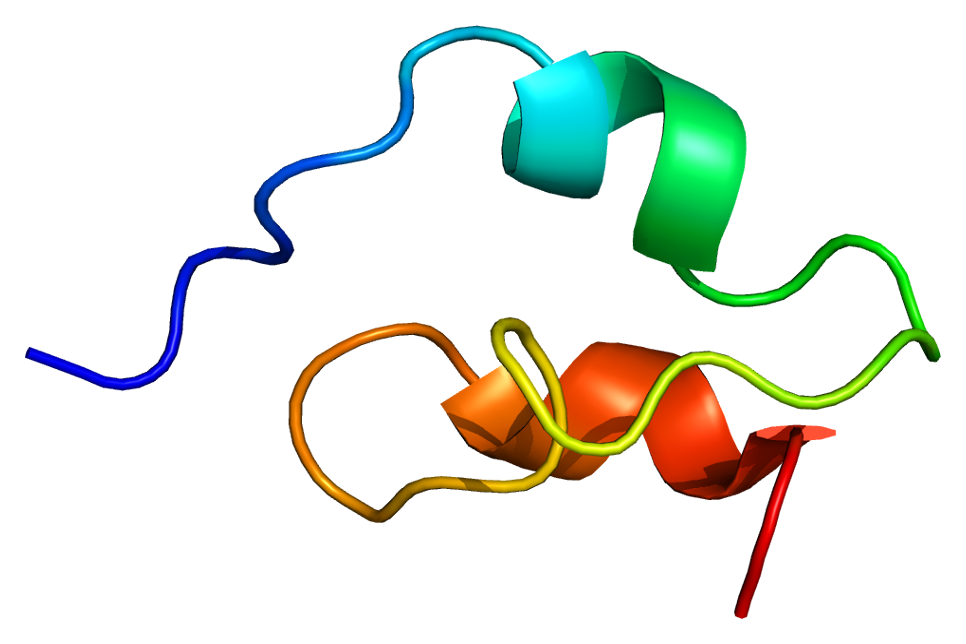

Identifiers
- Aliases: NOTCH1, Notch1, 9930111A19Rik, Mis6, N1, Tan1, lin-12, AOS5, AOVD1, hN1, notch 1, notch receptor 1
- External IDs: OMIM: 190198; MGI: 97363; GeneCards: NOTCH1
Available structures
PDB	Ortholog search: PDBe RCSB
PDB	List of PDB id codes 1PB5, 1TOZ, 1YYH, 2F8X, 2F8Y, 2HE0, 2VJ3, 3ETO, 3I08, 3L95, 3NBN, 3V79, 4CUD, 4CUE, 4CUF, 4D0E, 4D0F, 5FM9, 5FMA

Gene location (Human)
Chr.	Chromosome 9 (human)
Band	9q34.3	Start	136,494,433 bp
Band	9q34.3	End	136,546,048 bp

Gene location (Mouse)
Chr.	Chromosome 2 (mouse)
Band	2 A3|2 18.91 cM	Start	26,347,915 bp
Band	2 A3|2 18.91 cM	End	26,406,675 bp
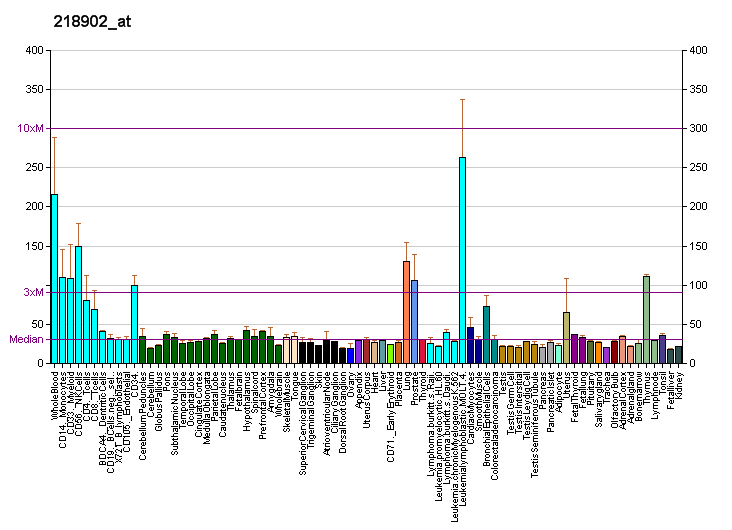
RNA expression pattern
Bgee	Human / Mouse (ortholog); Top expressed in: ventricular zone; epithelium of colon; visceral pleura; external globus pallidus; ganglionic eminence; blood; gingival epithelium; superficial temporal artery; granulocyte; vulva / Top expressed in: hair follicle; vestibular sensory epithelium; vasculature of trunk; Rostral migratory stream; granulocyte; transitional epithelium of urinary bladder; conjunctival fornix; renal corpuscle; skin of back; vestibular membrane of cochlear duct; More reference expression data
BioGPS	More reference expression data
Gene ontology
Molecular function	calcium ion binding; DNA-binding transcription factor activity; Notch binding; enzyme inhibitor activity; metal ion binding; enzyme binding; chromatin binding; protein binding; sequence-specific DNA binding; protein heterodimerization activity; chromatin DNA binding; transmembrane signaling receptor activity; signaling receptor activity; RNA polymerase II cis-regulatory region sequence-specific DNA binding; DNA-binding transcription activator activity, RNA polymerase II-specific
Cellular component	cytoplasm; cytosol; membrane; adherens junction; extracellular region; nucleus; cell surface; apical plasma membrane; endoplasmic reticulum; integral component of membrane; Golgi apparatus; receptor complex; plasma membrane; nucleoplasm; MAML1-RBP-Jkappa- ICN1 complex; cell periphery; endoplasmic reticulum membrane; Golgi membrane; acrosomal vesicle; cytoplasmic vesicle
Biological process	cardiac vascular smooth muscle cell development; endoderm development; pulmonary valve morphogenesis; positive regulation of endothelial cell differentiation; regulation of somitogenesis; cell differentiation in spinal cord; negative regulation of neuron differentiation; regulation of extracellular matrix assembly; distal tubule development; negative regulation of glial cell proliferation; epithelial to mesenchymal transition involved in endocardial cushion formation; regulation of transcription by RNA polymerase II; aortic valve morphogenesis; oligodendrocyte differentiation; endocardium morphogenesis; negative regulation of osteoblast differentiation; negative regulation of stem cell differentiation; negative regulation of ossification; heart looping; negative regulation of photoreceptor cell differentiation; arterial endothelial cell differentiation; atrioventricular valve morphogenesis; Notch signaling pathway involved in regulation of secondary heart field cardioblast proliferation; humoral immune response; foregut morphogenesis; negative regulation of oligodendrocyte differentiation; positive regulation of cardiac muscle cell proliferation; regulation of developmental process; mesenchymal cell development; animal organ regeneration; angiogenesis; spermatogenesis; negative regulation of pro-B cell differentiation; regulation of cardioblast proliferation; hair follicle morphogenesis; vasculogenesis involved in coronary vascular morphogenesis; negative regulation of canonical Wnt signaling pathway; regulation of neurogenesis; negative regulation of cell population proliferation; collecting duct development; positive regulation of neuroblast proliferation; cilium assembly; heart trabecula morphogenesis; atrioventricular node development; negative regulation of myoblast differentiation; cell fate commitment; regulation of transcription, DNA-templated; cellular response to follicle-stimulating hormone stimulus; lung development; negative regulation of inner ear auditory receptor cell differentiation; cardiac septum morphogenesis; ventricular septum morphogenesis; negative regulation of cell differentiation; coronary artery morphogenesis; response to muramyl dipeptide; cardiac left ventricle morphogenesis; in utero embryonic development; negative regulation of cell death; endocardial cell differentiation; transcription, DNA-templated; positive regulation of transcription, DNA-templated; development of the heart; prostate gland epithelium morphogenesis; embryonic limb morphogenesis; growth involved in heart morphogenesis; neural tube development; pericardium morphogenesis; epidermis development; cardiac atrium morphogenesis; transcription initiation from RNA polymerase II promoter; cardiac right atrium morphogenesis; negative regulation of cell-substrate adhesion; cell migration involved in endocardial cushion formation; cell differentiation; venous endothelial cell differentiation; regulation of inner ear auditory receptor cell differentiation; negative regulation of catalytic activity; inflammatory response to antigenic stimulus; positive regulation of astrocyte differentiation; positive regulation of epithelial cell proliferation; cardiac right ventricle formation; endocardial cushion development; cell fate specification; positive regulation of keratinocyte differentiation; positive regulation of glial cell differentiation; negative regulation of neurogenesis; glomerular mesangial cell development; sprouting angiogenesis; glial cell differentiation; negative regulation of transcription by RNA polymerase II; cardiac muscle cell proliferation; secretory columnal luminar epithelial cell differentiation involved in prostate glandular acinus development; positive regulation of epithelial to mesenchymal transition; ventricular trabecula myocardium morphogenesis; neuronal stem cell population maintenance; negative regulation of cell migration involved in sprouting angiogenesis; response to lipopolysaccharide; compartment pattern specification; immune response; neuron differentiation; epithelial to mesenchymal transition; positive regulation of BMP signaling pathway; skeletal muscle cell differentiation; regulation of gene expression; positive regulation of viral genome replication; regulation of epithelial cell proliferation involved in prostate gland development; negative regulation of transcription, DNA-templated; cardiac ventricle morphogenesis; branching morphogenesis of an epithelial tube; positive regulation of receptor signaling pathway via JAK-STAT; negative regulation of anoikis; Notch signaling involved in heart development; coronary vein morphogenesis; apoptotic process involved in embryonic digit morphogenesis; regulation of cell migration; axonogenesis; tissue regeneration; positive regulation of cell migration; somatic stem cell division; cardiac muscle tissue morphogenesis; negative regulation of endothelial cell chemotaxis; keratinocyte differentiation; negative regulation of BMP signaling pathway; endocardial cushion morphogenesis; endocardium development; multicellular organism development; auditory receptor cell fate commitment; response to corticosteroid; tube formation; determination of left/right symmetry; astrocyte differentiation; negative regulation of calcium ion-dependent exocytosis; brain development; regulation of cell population proliferation; positive regulation of cell population proliferation; negative regulation of myotube differentiation; positive regulation of apoptotic process; positive regulation of transcription from RNA polymerase II promoter in response to hypoxia; mitral valve formation; liver development; cardiac chamber formation; forebrain development; cellular response to vascular endothelial growth factor stimulus; neuron fate commitment; regulation of epithelial cell proliferation; regulation of Notch signaling pathway; left/right axis specification; positive regulation of transcription by RNA polymerase II; cardiac epithelial to mesenchymal transition; embryonic hindlimb morphogenesis; positive regulation of aorta morphogenesis; venous blood vessel morphogenesis; Notch signaling pathway; negative regulation of gene expression; negative regulation of growth rate; positive regulation of Ras protein signal transduction; positive regulation of ERK1 and ERK2 cascade; positive regulation of transcription of Notch receptor target; positive regulation of Notch signaling pathway; outflow tract morphogenesis; coronary sinus valve morphogenesis; negative regulation of cell proliferation involved in heart valve morphogenesis; negative regulation of extracellular matrix constituent secretion; negative regulation of cardiac muscle hypertrophy; positive regulation of gene expression; homeostasis of number of cells within a tissue; negative regulation of biomineral tissue development; positive regulation of apoptotic process involved in morphogenesis; positive regulation of cardiac epithelial to mesenchymal transition; negative regulation of cold-induced thermogenesis
Sources:Amigo / QuickGO
Orthologs
Databases	NCBI: entry; OMA: entry
Species	Human	Mouse
Entrez	4851	18128
Ensembl	ENSG00000148400	ENSMUSG00000026923
UniProt	P46531	Q01705
RefSeq (mRNA)	NM_017617	NM_008714
RefSeq (protein)	NP_060087	NP_032740
Location (UCSC)	Chr 9: 136.49 – 136.55 Mb	Chr 2: 26.35 – 26.41 Mb
PubMed search
- Wikidata
View/Edit Human	View/Edit Mouse

Neurogenic locus notch homolog protein 1 (Notch 1) is a protein encoded in humans by the NOTCH1 gene. Notch 1 is a single-pass transmembrane receptor.

== Function ==
This gene encodes a member of the Notch family. Members of this type 1 transmembrane protein family share structural characteristics including an extracellular domain consisting of multiple epidermal growth factor-like (EGF) repeats, and an intracellular domain consisting of multiple, different domain types. Notch family members play a role in a variety of developmental processes by controlling cell fate decisions. The Notch signaling network is an evolutionarily conserved intercellular signaling pathway that regulates interactions between physically adjacent cells. In Drosophila, notch interaction with its cell-bound ligands (delta, serrate) establishes an intercellular signaling pathway that plays a key role in development. Homologues of the notch-ligands have also been identified in humans, but precise interactions between these ligands and the human notch homologues remain to be determined. This protein is cleaved in the trans-Golgi network, and presented on the cell surface as a heterodimer. This protein functions as a receptor for membrane bound ligands, and may play multiple roles during development.

A deficiency can be associated with bicuspid aortic valve.

There is evidence that activated Notch 1 and Notch 3 promote differentiation of progenitor cells into astroglia. Notch 1, when activated before birth, induces radial glia differentiation, but postnatally induces the differentiation into astrocytes. One study shows that Notch-1 cascade is activated by Reelin in an unidentified way. Reelin and Notch1 cooperate in the development of the dentate gyrus, according to another.

NOTCH1 is a transmembrane receptor that plays an important role in the Notch signaling pathway, which regulates cell-to-cell communication and determines cell fate during embryonic development. The NOTCH1 protein is activated when a ligand from a neighboring cell binds to its receptor. Following activation, part of the receptor is cleaved and translocates into the nucleus, where it regulates gene expression. This signaling process is essential for controlling cell proliferation, differentiation, and apoptosis. During embryonic development, NOTCH1 is critical for the formation of the cardiovascular and nervous systems, as well as placental development. NOTCH1 signaling also helps regulate whether progenitor cells remain undifferentiated or differentiate into specialized cell types. Genetic knockout studies in mice have demonstrated that loss of NOTCH1 results in severe developmental defects and embryonic lethality, often due to vascular abnormalities. In humans, NOTCH1 deficiency has been associated with congenital heart defects such as hypoplastic left heart syndrome. Additionally, NOTCH1 plays a key role in placental development by regulating the formation of the extravillous trophoblast lineage, which is essential for implantation and maternal–fetal nutrient and oxygen exchange.

== Interactions ==
NOTCH1 has been shown to interact with:

- GSK3B,
- Lck,
- MAML1,
- Mothers against decapentaplegic homolog 3
- NFKB1,
- NOV,
- RBPJ,
- SNW1,
- Ubiquitin C, and
- YY1.
- USP10.
