= Childhood-onset systemic lupus erythematosus =

- Other names: cSLE, Juvenile-onset systemic lupus erythematosus, juvenile systemic lupus erythematosus, and pediatric systemic lupus erythematosus
- Specialty: Rheumatology
- Usual onset: Children up to 17 years old
- Types: Early-onset SLE is a type of cSLE that occurs in children up to 5 years old. It tends to be more severe than cSLE in older children.
- Causes: Production of antibodies that bind with one's own antigens to cause uncontrolled inflammation and injury in various tissues and organs

Childhood-onset systemic lupus erythematosus (i.e., cSLE), also termed juvenile-onset systemic lupus erythematosus, juvenile systemic lupus erythematosus, and pediatric systemic lupus erythematosus, is a form of the chronic inflammatory and autoimmune disease, systemic lupus erythematosus (SLE), that develops in individuals up to 18 years old. Early-onset systemic lupus erythematosus is often used to designate a subset of cSLE patients who are up to 5 years old. Children with early-onset SLE tend to have a more severe form of cSLE than children who develop cSLE after 5 years of age.

cSLE does not include neonatal lupus erythematosus (nSLE). nSLE is a SLE-like disease that is present in infants at birth. It is caused by certain antinuclear antibodies, e.g., the immunoglobulin G types of the anti-SSA/Ro autoantibodies (e.g., anti-Ro/SS-A and anti-La/SS-B) and anti-nRNP (also termed anti-U1RNP). These antibodies form in the mother and pass from her circulation through the placenta to the fetus where they cause an often severe form of SLE that is evident in the fetus and newborn child. Most of the disorders in the infants disappear within months as these antibodies are naturally cleared from the infant. However, one disorder occurring in nSLE, congenital heart block, usually does not reverse and is potentially lethal. Fetuses and neonates with this heart block are implanted with an artificial cardiac pacemaker. However, recent studies have shown that hydroxychloroquine given to the mother in her 6th and 10th gestational weeks or intravenous immunoglobulin therapy given to the mother in her 14 and 18 gestational weeks reduces the incidence of developing this heart block (Intravenous immunoglobulins given to the mother suppress her production of antibodies including those that cause nSLE.).

cSLE, similar to adult-onset SLE (i.e. aSLE), is caused by an individual's production of antibodies that bind to antigens located in the individual's own cells' nuclei and cytoplasm. These antibody-antigen complexes trigger uncontrolled inflammation and injury in various tissues and organs (see below section on "Inflammation"). Worldwide, the prevalence of cSLE is 1.9–25.7 per 100,000 children and its incidence is 0.3–0.9 per 100,000 per year. While there are similarities between the childhood and adult forms of SLE (i.e., aSLE), cSLE has several characteristics that make it a clinical entity distinct from aSLE. For example, cSLE has a more aggressive disease onset and course, more frequent disease exacerbations, more severe organ damages, and a higher mortality rate than aSLE.

== Presentation ==
cSLE occurs more frequently in Black, Asian, Hispanic, and Native American than Caucasian populations and is more frequently diagnosed in individuals from urban than rural areas. The median age at the onset of cSLE was 12.6 years in a review of 196 cases conducted in the United Kingdom. Patients with cSLE may present with tissue-injuring and blood vessel-injuring (termed lupus vasculitis) inflammation in the: a) kidneys, causing various types of kidney damages e.g., lupus nephritis and kidney failure, and thereby hypertension, i.e., high blood pressure; b) central nervous system, causing headaches, seizures, cerebrovascular disease, strokes, and neuropsychiatric systemic lupus erythematosus encephalopathies such as mood disorders, cognitive disorders, and psychoses; c) lung, causing pleuritis, pneumonitis (termed acute lupus pneumonitis), pulmonary hypertension, pulmonary hemorrhages, and a form of restrictive lung disease in which the lung has shrunk in size (this condition is termed the "shrinking lung syndrome", see rheumatoid lung disease); d) gastrointestinal tract, causing peritonitis and intestinal pseudo-obstructions; e) heart, causing pericarditis, myocarditis, endocarditis, and cardiac tamponade (i.e., pericardial fluid that compresses the heart); f) pancreas, causing pancreatitis, hyperlipidemia and, as a long-term consequence of hyperlipidemia, atherosclerosis and myocardial infarctions (i.e., heart attacks); g) joints, causing non-deforming arthritis and in rare cases the deforming arthritis, Jaccoud arthropathy; h) skeletal muscles, causing muscle pain and tenderness that may be accompanied by the same types of rashes, arthritides, and arthralgias that occur in the inflammatory muscle disease, dermatomyositis; and i) skin and mucous membranes, causing active and chronic lesions such as a malar rash, discoid rash (see discoid type rash), photodermatitis, oral/nasopharyngeal ulcers, cutaneous small-vessel vasculitis skin lesions, and in rare cases chilblain lupus erythematosus. cSLE may also present as autoimmune-induced decreases in the blood levels of platelets termed immune thrombocytopenic purpura), red blood cells termed autoimmune hemolytic anemia, leukocytes termed leukopenia, neutrophils termed neutropenia (neutrophils are a type of leukocyte), and lymphocytes termed lymphopenia. Patients with cSLE may also develop thrombotic microangiopathy, a severe disease caused by the aggregation of blood platelets in, and thereby partial occlusion of, the blood flow to and dysfunction of multiple organs including in particular the brain and kidneys. Individuals with cSLE-related thrombotic microangiopathy may also exhibit thrombocytopenia and/or hemolytic anemia. Fatigue is also a frequent complaint of children presenting with cSLE. Finally, cSLE patients on rare occasions develop functional asplenia (i.e., a poorly functioning spleen) that increases their susceptibility to infections.

Studies have shown that the presentations and extents of disease differ in patients with cSLE and aSLE. For example: a) cSLE afflicts 4–5 females to 1 male while aSLE afflicts 9 females to 1 male; b) cSLE involves the kidneys in 60–80% and aSLE in 35–50% of cases; c) cSLE involves the central nervous system in 20–50% and aSLE in 10–25% of cases; d) cSLE involves the lung in 15–40% and aSLE in 20–90% of cases; e) SLE involves the joints in 60–70% and aSLE in and 80–95% of cases; f) cSLE has a more aggressive disease and therefore requires more intensive therapy than aSLE; g) genetic disorders more often underlie the development of cSLE than aSLE (see "Genetics" in next section); and h) drug-induced SLE has been reported far less frequently in cSLE than aSLE (see "Drugs" next section). There are also some differences is the presentation of cSLE in different populations. For example, a study conducted in Japan reported that patients diagnosed with cSLE presented with a malar rash (73.1% of cases), discoid rash (17.7%), photosensitivity (23.1%), arthritis (33.3%), serositis (9.7%), hemolytic anemia (12.4%), and leukopenia (52.2%). In contrast, patients in Turkey diagnosed with cSLE presented with a malar rash (60.8%), discoid rash (11.8%), photosensitivity (44.1%), arthritis (46.1%), serositis (16.7%), hemolytic anemia (17.6%), and leucopenia (33.3%).

== Causes ==
=== Inflammation ===
SLE is caused by a not yet well understood generation of inflammation-inducing antibodies (termed autoantibodies) that attack an individual's own antigens. These autoantibodies, none of which are present in all cases of SLE, include the: a) antinuclear (i.e., ANA) and anti-dsDNA antibodies; b) anti-Sm, anti-RNP, anti-SSA, and anti–SS-B antibodies (anti-SSA and anti-SS-B antibodies are associated with less severe forms of cSLE);) c) antiphospholipid autoantibodies including the lupus anticoagulant, anti-cardiolipin, and anti-apolipoprotein autoantibodies; and d) anti-histone antibodies (anti-histone antibodies are associated with drug-induced SLE). When bound to their target antigens, these autoantibodies form immune complexes which attract and activate T cells, B cells, and other inflammation-inducing leukocytes. In addition, the antibody-antigen complexes are engulfed by plasmacytoid dendritic cells that then produce type I interferons which act to further promote the inflammation responses. More than 95% of individuals with cSLE display a type I IFN signature, i.e., increased whole blood, blood cells, or tissue levels of the messenger RNAs (i.e., mRNAs) for the type 1 interferons.

=== Gene mutations ===
Studies of identical twins (i.e., twins that develop from the same fertilized egg) and genome-wide association studies have identified numerous genes that when having certain types of mutations cause aSLE. The genes that have certain mutations which cause aSLE are termed as acting in a "monogenic" or "single-gene" manner. They include 5 that are classified as inborn errors of immunity genes, i.e., the DNASE1L3, TREX1, IFIH1, Tartrate-resistant acid phosphatase, and PRKCD genes and 29 other genes, i.e., NEIL3, TMEM173, ADAR1, NRAS, SAMHD1, SOS1, FASLG, FAS, RAG1, RAG2, DNASE1, SHOC2, KRAS, PTPN11, PTEN, BLK, RNASEH2A, RNASEH2B, RNASEH2C, Complement component 1qA, Complement component 1qB, Complement component 1r, Complement component 1s, Complement component 2, Complement component 3, TLR7, UNC93B1 (Mutations in the UNC93B1 gene cause either SLE or the chilblain lupus erythematosus variant of SLE.), and two complement component 4 genes, C4A and C4B. The C4A and C4B genes code respectively for complement component A and complement component B proteins. The two proteins made by these genes combine to form the complement component 4 protein which plays various roles in regulating immune function. Individuals normally have multiple copies of the C4A and C4B genes but develop SLE if they have a mutation in one of them that significantly reduces the number of its copies. While it is suggested that any of these gene mutations may cause cSLE, the monogenetic mutations to date documented to cause cSLE include only 10 genes, i.e., IFIH1, DNASE1L3, TLR7, complement component 1qA, complement component 1qB, complement component 1r, complement component 1s, complement component 2, C4a, and C4B. However, a 2018 review of 44 patients with aSLE found that 9 had dramatically decreased plasma levels of N1-acetylcadaverine, spermidine, N1-acetylspermidine, and spermine. This could be due to inactivating mutations in SAT1, the gene encoding spermidine/spermine N1-acetyltransferase, an enzyme that makes these metabolites. A recent study reported that loss of function mutations in the SAT1 gene were present in two unrelated African American mothers and two boys in each of their families. Since the SAT1 gene is on the X-chromosome and only one of their two X- chromosomes carried this mutated gene, the mothers of these children had one normal SAT1 gene and therefore did not have decreases in the cited 4 metabolites or cSLE. In contrast, the two boys (males carry only one X-chromosome) in each family had the mutated SAT1 gene, had dramatically depressed plasma levels of these metabolites, and developed cSLE (see X-linked recessive inheritance). Although further studies are needed, these results suggest that loss of function mutations in the SAT1 gene cause cSLE and may also do so in aSLE.

Mutations in a wide range of other genes do not by themselves cause SLE but act in concert with other genes, environmental factors, or unknown factors in some but not other populations to cause SLE. The development of a genetically regulated trait or disorder that is dependent on the inheritance of two or more mutated genes is termed oligogenic inheritance or polygenic inheritance. The article published by Sestan, et al., lists more than 110 genes that must act in cooperation with other factors to promote the development of aSLE and/or cSLE.

=== Drugs ===
Drug-induced SLE is an autoimmune disease in which individuals develop clinical features similar to that in SLE after taking a drug. It is estimated to represent 10% to 12% of all SLE cases. Although there are no established criteria for diagnosing drug-induced SLE, most reports used the following criteria: afflicted individuals had a sufficient and continuing exposure to the drug, at least one symptom seen in SLE, no history of SLE symptoms before starting the drug, and resolution of their drug-induced symptom(s) within weeks or months after discontinuing the offending drug. The American College of Rheumatology has suggested at least one serologic and one non-serological criterium (see below section on "Diagnosis of cSLE") be included in the criteria used to diagnose drug-induced SLE. The VigiBase drug safety data repositor reviewed 12,166 cases of drug-induced aSLE that were recorded between 1968 and 2017. Among the 118 drugs causing these aSLE cases, five main drug classes were most often associated with the development of aSLE: a) various inhibitors of tumor necrosis factor; b) antiarrhythmic agents such as procainamide and quinidine; c) antihypertensive agents such as hydralazine, captopril, and acebutolol; d) antimicrobial agents such as minocycline, isoniazid, carbamazepine, and phenytoin; e) anticonvulsants such as carbamazepine; and f) polyinosinic:polycytidylic acid (an artificial interferon inducer).

There are fewer reports of drug-induced SLE in children than adults. In a review of 65 cases described in the English language, Kaya Akca, U. et al., 2024 reported that cSLE was caused by ethosuximide (13 cases), minocycline (12 cases), ethosuximide combined with a hydantoin (3 cases), propylthiouracil combined with sulphasalazine (3 cases), carbamazepine (3 cases), cysteamine (2 cases), etanercept (2 cases), isoniazid (2 cases), trimethadione combined with ethosuximide and hydantoin (2 cases), and single cases of adalimumab, cefepime, dapsone, doxycycline, griseofulvin, hydantoin, hydralazine, infliximab, interferon alpha, levamisole, minocycline combined with dianette, polyinosinic-polycytidylic acid, procainamide, thiamazole combined with propylthiouracil, topiramate, trimethadione, and zafirlukast. In 3 cases, the offending drug was not identified. The duration of these individuals' drug exposure was (0.2 to 150 months, median of 9 months). The clinical manifestations of their disorder which were observed in more than 1 patient were: fever (in 50.8% of cases), arthralgia (47.7%), rash (46.2%), arthritis (44.6%), malar rash (23.1%), proteinuria (20.%), lymphadenopathy (16.9%), myalgia (15.4%), weight loss (12.3%), anemia (9.2%), edema of the extremities and face (9.2%), fatigue (9.2%), lupus nephritis (9.2%), nausea (9.2%), pleural effusions (9.2%), headaches 5 (7.7%), hepatosplenomegaly or just splenomegaly (7.7%), malaise (7.7%), joint stiffness felt when awakening from sleep (7.7%), chest pain (6.1%), hematuria (6.1%), leukopenia (6.1%), myocarditis and/or pericarditis (6.1%), pneumonia (6.1%), generalized weakness (6.1%), oral ulcers, (6.1%), abdominal pain (4.6%), reductions in the number of almost all blood cells termed pancytopenia (4.6%), photosensitivity (4.6%), respiratory distress (4.6%), thrombocytopenia (4.6%), and hepatitis (3.1%).

=== Vitamin D deficiency ===
Studies have reported that: vitamin D deficiency often occurs in patients with aSLE; vitamin D levels are particularly low in patients with more active aSLE; and aSLE patients treated with vitamin D have significant reductions in the activity of their disease. While other studies have not found these results, it is clear that the serum levels of vitamin D are often low in, and perhaps as a result of having, aSLE. This is particularly the case in cSLE. Vitamin D is obtained by consuming it or its precursors in food and by forming its precursors in the cells of the skin exposed to sunlight (see Vitamin D formation in skin cells). By binding to its receptor, vitamin D increases calcium absorption from the intestine, increases calcium reabsorption from the kidneys, and regulates the immunological functions of macrophages, T cells, and dendritic cells. In consequence, the low levels of vitamin D in cSLE may cause excessive losses of body calcium, hypocalcemia, low bone density, osteoporosis, increased risk of developing bone fractures, and reduced ability to suppress tissue inflammatory reactions. The factors that tend to lower vitamin D in individuals with SLE include: a) avoidance of sunlight and ultraviolet light exposure because of SLE-related photosensitivity; b) reduced consumption of vitamin D due to the loss appetite caused by SLE itself and/or the medications used to treat SLE (e.g., glucocorticoids); c) glucocorticoid-induced reductions in vitamin D levels; d) inhibition of the actions of vitamin D receptors by hydroxychloroquine, a drug which is commonly used to treat SLE; and e) low levels of vitamin D production by lupus nephritis-afflicted kidneys (along with the liver, the kidney forms vitamin D from its precursors that were in the diet or formed by sunlight, see the below section "Treatment for vitamin D deficiency in cSLE").

== Diagnosis of cSLE ==
=== Systemic Lupus International Collaborating Clinics criteria ===
The diagnosis of SLE can be challenging because not one its symptoms or biomarkers by themselves are sufficient to indicate that the disease is SLE. Currently, the diagnosis of SLE depends on finding a combination of criteria that strongly support it. The Systemic Lupus International Collaborating Clinics (SLICC) is an international group dedicated to studying SLE. This group evaluated the following Clinical and Immunological criteria (i.e., immunological biomarkers) for diagnosing SLE. The group concluded that patients satisfying 4 of the 16 criteria listed below including at least one of the 10 Clinical criterium and one of the 6 Immunologic criterion had on their initial evaluation a sensitivity (i.e., probability of a positive test result conditioned on the individual truly being positive) of 82.7% and a specificity (i.e., probability of a negative test result, conditioned on the individual truly being negative) of 93.5% for cSLE. These two respective values for aSLE were 94% and 92%. Patients satisfying these criteria were therefore diagnosed as having cSLE or aSLE. For further details on these criteria see Fonseca, AR et al. and Petri, M et al.

Clinical criteria: Individuals exhibiting 1) lesions that occur in acute cutaneous lupus erythematosus such as a malar rash, toxic epidermal necrolysis, bullae, (i.e., large blisters containing serous fluid), maculopapular rashes, photosensitive lupus-like rashes (in individuals who do not have dermatomyositis), or subacute cutaneous lupus erythematosus-like lesions, e.g., scar-like polycyclic annular or plaque-like lesions on the skin most commonly in areas exposed to sunlight; 2) clinical signs found in discoid lupus erythematosus (with or without signs found in lichen planus) such as verrucous lupus erythematosus, lupus erythematosus panniculitis, mucosal lupus (i.e., lupus lesions involving mucous membrane), lupus erythematosus tumidus, or chilblain lupus erythematosus; 3) oral ulcers, i.e., ulcers on the mucous membranes of the nose, palate, tongue, and/or gums (in the absence of other causes such as vasculitis, Behçet's disease, Herpes infection, inflammatory bowel disease, reactive arthritis, or the excessive intake of acidic foods); 4) nonscarring alopecia, i.e., diffuse hair thinning or fragility with visibly broken hairs (in the absence of other causes such as alopecia areata, drugs, iron deficiency, and androgenic alopecia; 5) synovitis involving two or more joints plus 30 minutes or more of morning joint stiffness; 6) pleurisy lasting more than one day, a pleural effusion or a pleural rub, serositis of the heart as shown by symptoms of pericardial pain that lasts for more than one day and is lessened by sitting forward, pericardial effusion, pericardial friction rub, or EKG evidence of pericarditis (in the absence of other causes such as infection, uremia, or Dressler's syndrome); 7) kidney dysfunction as indicated by a 24-hour urine protein of at least 500 milligram (i.e., mg) or the presence of red blood cell casts; 8) neurologic disorders such as seizures, psychosis, mononeuritis multiplex (in the absence of other causes such as primary vasculitis), myelitis, neuropathy in the peripheral or cranial nerves (not due to other causes such as primary vasculitis, infection, or diabetes mellitus), and acute mental confusion (in the absence of other causes such as toxic encephalopathy, uremia, or drugs); 9) hemolytic anemia; and 10) leukopenia with blood leukocyte levels less than 4,0000 per cubic millimeter occurring at least once (in the absence of other known causes such as Felty's syndrome, drugs, or portal hypertension), lymphopenia with blood lymphocyte counts less than 1000 per cubic millimeter (in the absence of other known causes such as drugs and infection), or thrombocytopenia with blood platelet counts less than 100,000/ per cubic milliliter (in the absence of other known causes such as drugs, portal hypertension, or thrombotic thrombocytopenic purpura).

Immunological criteria: Individuals exhibiting 1) high serum levels of antinuclear antibodies; 2) high serum levels of anti-dsDNA antibodies; 3) high serum levels of anti-Sm antibodies; 4) high blood levels of antiphospholipid antibodies, high blood levels of the lupus anticoagulant, a false positive rapid plasma reagin test, or a medium to high titer of IgA, IgG or IgM anti-cardiolipin or anti-β2 glycoprotein I-dependent anti-cardiolipin antibodies; 5) low serum levels of complement C3, complement C4, or total complement activity as measure by the CH50 test; and 6) a positive direct Coombs test in the absence of hemolytic anemia.

==== SLICC criteria for lupus nephritis ====
The SLICC also defined individuals with biopsy-proven lupus nephritis plus elevated blood levels of antinuclear and/or anti-dsDNA antibodies as having aSLE or cSLE.

=== European League Against Rheumatism/American College of Rheumatology criteria ===
In 2020, the European League Against Rheumatism (now named the European Alliance of Associations for Rheumatology) in collaboration with the American College of Rheumatology developed a different set of criteria for diagnosing SLE in patients aged 2–21 years old. They determined that individuals in this age group had SLE if they had: a) a serum titer of 1:80 or higher for any one of the antinuclear antibodies as measured using cultured HEp-2 cells or other valid measurements of these antibodies and b) one or more of 7 specified constitutional, hematologic, neuropsychiatric, mucocutaneous, serosal, renal, or musculoskeletal clinical symptoms plus elevated serum levels of antiphospholipid antibodies, the iC3b split product of complement component 3 and/or 4b split product of complement component 4, and SLE-specific antibodies. Each of these items received a severity score ranging from 2 to 10 with individuals being diagnosed as having cSLE if they receive a summary score of 10 or higher. The sensitivity and specificity scores of these criteria in diagnosing SLE in this age group were 84.8 and 82.8, respectively.

=== Genetic criteria ===
The diagnosis of cSLE in individuals with cSLE-like findings is indicated in individuals with any one of the monogenic gene mutations known to cause cSLE (see the above section on Genetics). It is likely that a least some of the gene mutations causing aSLE not yet known to cause cSLE will be found to cause cSLE and therefore be regarded as diagnostic of cSLE.

=== Factors suggesting the diagnosis of cSLE ===
The diagnose of cSLE is suggested in individuals with any symptoms of cSLE who have: a) one or more family members with a history of having SLE; b) mutations in genes that must interact with other genes to cause SLE (see above section on Genetics); or c) detectable blood and/or blood leukocyte levels of the mRNA for genes activated by the type-1 interferons, e.g., the EPSTI1, IFI44L, LY6E, OAS3, RSAD2 and sialoadhesin genes (the gene for sialoadhesin is termed SIGLEC-1). The abnormal presence of these mRNAs in tissues is sometimes termed the "interferon signature" or "high interferon signature". These interferon signature mRNAs have been detected in up to 90-95% of individuals with cSLE.

== Treatment ==
Individuals with cSLE should be: a) advised to protect themselves against inflammation-inducing ultraviolet light by avoiding, and using sunscreen to block, sunlight; b) counseled on their nutritional needs (e.g., their diets should be low in salt and, if routine checks indicate their vitamin D blood levels are low, contain supplemental vitamin D); and c) offered mental health services if showing signs of depression, anxiety, and/or ineffective family coping. Furthermore, cSLE patients are infection-prone due to their taking immunosuppressive drugs and/or having functional asplenia (i.e., a poorly functioning spleen).Since infections are a common cause of disease flares and mortality in cSLE, cSLE patients should be encouraged to be immunized against Streptococcus pneumoniae, Neisseria meningitidis, Haemophilus influenzae, Clostridium tetani, and Neisseria meningitidis bacteria and against Influenza B, Hepatitis A, Hepatitis B, Papillomaviridae, (which cause warts and various cancers including cervical cancer), and SARS-CoV-2 viruses. Attenuated vaccines, i.e., vaccines containing live but weakened viruses such as the varicella, measles, mumps, rubella, MMR (i.e., combined measles, mumps, and rubella), and yellow fever vaccines are contraindicated for cSLE patients who are immunosuppressed by their disease and/or treatment with immunosuppressing drugs.

=== Treatment for vitamin D deficiency in cSLE ===
Childhood-onset and young adults diagnosed with cSLE commonly have low serum levels of 25(OH)D. 25(OH)D stands for two agents, ergocalciferol (also termed 25-hydroxyvitamin D_{2}) and calcifediol (also termed 25-hydroxyvitamin D_{3}) which are commonly measured together. Normal levels of 25(OH)D are 30 to 100 nanogram (i.e., ng) per milliliter (i.e., ml) of serum. Patients with serum levels of 25(OH)D below 30 ng per ml should be given 50,000 international units of oral cholecalciferol per week for 6 months or longer in order to attain and maintain normal levels of 25(OH)D. This replacement regimen is well-tolerated and significantly decreases patient fatigue and their scores on the Systemic Lupus Erythematosus Disease Activity Index 2000 survey (which rates non-fatigue cSLE symptoms).

=== Treatments for drug-induced cSLE ===
In a review of 65 individuals with cSLE caused by the drugs cited in the above section "Drug", discontinuing the responsible drug in 100% of cases and treatment with a glucocorticoid in 53.3% of cases, hydroxychloroquine in 8.4% of cases, and cyclophosphamide in 3.3% of cases resulted in improvements in 92.0% of the 63 individuals available for follow-up studies. These improvements usually began shortly after treatment began but in rare cases required several weeks or months to occur.

=== Treatments for cSLE not drug-induced ===
The current treatments for cSLE not drug-induced are based on trials in aSLE which showed that certain drug regimens, while not producing cures, improved the long-term symptoms and survival in aSLE. Studies are needed to determine if other treatments beside these would prove better treatments for cSLE. The following treatments focus on drugs which suppress the inflammatory component of the cSLE disorders. However, many of these disorders require treatments that in addition to suppressing inflammation treat the serious consequences of the inflammatory reactions such as direct measures to reduce cardiac tamponade and hemodialysis followed by kidney transplantation to treat end-stage kidney failure. The measures used to treat the serious consequences of autoimmune inflammation-induced tissue and organ damage are discussed elsewhere.

Hydroxychloroquine is recommended as first-line therapy to treat all cSLE patients unless they have contraindications to taking it. Hydroxychloroquine is an antimalarial drug that also reduces the fatigue, mucosal, and cutaneous symptoms, alopecia, disease flares, and blood lipid levels in cSLE. Since it can damage the retina, annual ophthalmology examinations of hydroxychloroquine-takers are needed to assess retinal changes which if present indicate that the drug should be discontinued. Hydroxychloroquine is taken at daily dosages of 5 or more mg per kilogram (i.e., kg) of patient weights per day but not exceeding a total of 400 mg per person per day. Individuals treated with hydroxychloroquine at dosages less than 6.5 mg per kg of body weight per day rarely develop retinal injury.

Glucocorticoids (e.g., prednisone, prednisolone, hydrocortisone, and methylprednisolone) are used to suppress the intensity of the inflammatory component of cSLE. Topical glucocorticoid ointments are used to treat mild to moderate skin rashes while an oral or injectable glucocorticoid is used for non-cutaneous inflammations. For example, prednisone is used at low doses (equal to or less than 7.5 mg per day), medium doses (greater than 7.5 mg but less than 30 mg per day), or high doses (greater than 30 mg but less than 100 mg per day) to treat mild, moderate, or severe inflammations, respectively, such as those causing neurological, hematologic, and kidney disorders. Pulse dosages of prednisone (i.e., 250 mg per day for one to a few days) may also be used for moderate to severe inflammations. Glucocorticoids, particularly when used long-term, cause hyperglycemia, diabetes, hypertension, dyslipidemia, growth suppression, weight gains, abdominal obesity, moon facies, buffalo humps (i.e., humps on the back or nape), thinning of the skin, hirsutism, avascular necrosis of the femur's head, myopathy, adrenal insufficiency, delayed puberty, gastritis, bleeding and ulcers in the gastrointestinal tract, pancreatitis, hypertension, congestive heart failure, insomnia, mood disorders (i.e., depression, anxiety, loss of emotional control, euphoria, hypomania, mania, and psychoses), cataracts, glaucoma, and increased susceptibility to infections. Children face a significantly higher risk of glucocorticoid-related complications such as cataracts and avascular bone necrosis than adults.

Nonsteroidal anti-inflammatory drugs (i.e., NSAIDs) such as aspirin, naproxen, ibuprofen, indomethacin, tolmetin, and ketoprofen are useful for treating fevers, arthritis, and small pleural and pericardial effusions in cSLE patients. The adverse effects of NSAIDs in pediatric patients include ulcers, bleeding, and perforation of the gastrointestinal tract; allergic reactions in the skin; lipodystrophy, and reductions in kidney function such as low glomerular filtration rates, kidney disorders such as interstitial nephritis, renal papillary necrosis, and, in patients with kidney failure, lupus nephritis. (Interstitial nephritis and renal papillary necrosis are rare, idiosyncratic toxic reactions to NSAIDs). NSAIDs may also be toxic to the central nervous system. For example, indomethacin often produces headaches, aspirin can cause ringing in the ears or dizziness, and ibuprofen or, less frequently, other NSAIDs, may cause aseptic meningitis. Finally, aspirin often causes hepatic toxicity in patients with more severe SLE cases. It is recommended that periodic hematological, renal, and liver function tests be conducted in cSLE patients taking these drugs.

Methotrexate is used orally or by subcutaneous injection once a week at dosages of 15 to 20 mg per square meter of body size to reduce the levels of glucocorticoids needed to treat mild to moderate cSLE-induced inflammatory diseases, especially those involving the musculoskeletal system. It is also used to treat cSLE arthritis that is refractory to NSAIDs. Methotrexate can cause food intolerance, liver damage, and bone marrow suppression. It should not be used in patients with significant kidney disease because it is eliminated primarily by the kidneys and in patients with damaged kidneys rapidly builds-up to reach toxic levels (see adverse effects of methotrexate).

Mycophenolate mofetil is used at an oral daily dosage of 1200 to 1800 mg per square meter of body size (maximum daily dosage of 3000 mg per square meter of body size) as induction and maintenance therapy to treat the proliferative and membranous glomerulonephritis forms of lupus nephritis (see Classification of lupus nephritis and the following section titled "Treatment of lupus nephritis"), to treat psychiatric disease, and to reduce the amount of glucocorticoids needed to treat moderate and severe inflammatory diseases in cSLE. Children taking this drug may develop bone marrow suppression and an increased susceptibility to infections.

Cyclophosphamide is used at 500 mg per dose for 6 doses every 2 weeks over a one-month period or six 500 to 750 mg intravenous doses per square meter of body surface for 3 years to treat severe cSLE disease and as induction therapy for lupus nephritis. Patients taking these regimens may develop bone marrow suppression, susceptibility to infections, decreased ovarian reserve (i.e., lower capacity of the ovary to provide egg cells that are capable of being fertilized), sperm abnormalities, and malignancies.

Rituximab is a monoclonal antibody that is used to treat severe and refractory cases of cSLE. It is given at intravenous dosages of 750 mg per square meter of body surface area twice over 2 week intervals or at 375 mg per square meter body surface area once a week for 4 weeks over a 1-month period. Individuals taking either of these regimens may develop persistent hypogammaglobulinemia and an increased risk of developing infections and infusion reactions (see Cytokine release syndrome). Infusion reactions are adverse reactions to the intravenous or subcutaneous infusion of pharmacological or biological substances. These reactions may be mild to moderate (e.g., skin flushing, pruritus, and/or urticaria) that develop during or within several hours after the infusion of rituximab and are easily managed but in severe cases can be life-threatening (e.g., cause anaphylaxis) that require immediate medical interventions.

Belimumab is a monoclonal antibody that inhibits B-cell activating factor and thereby inflammation. It was approved in 2019 by the US Food and Drug Administration to treat the musculoskeletal, cutaneous, and cardiac manifestations of children with cSLE who are over 5 years old. It is given intravenously to cSLE patients with active disease but should not be given to cSLE patients who have active neuropsychiatric cSLE, acute, severe systemic lupus erythematosus disease, or are taking prednisone at doses greater that 1.5 mg per kg per day. Patients taking belimumab have an increased susceptibility to infections.

Calcineurin inhibitors, i.e., tacrolimus, cyclosporin, and voclosporin, inhibit the proliferation of T-cells but also have non-immunological actions that may be relevant to cSLE-based kidney disease, e.g., they reduce proteinuria, stabilize the cytoskeleton of the podocyte cells in the kidneys' Bowman's capsule, constrict the kidneys' afferent arterioless, and activate the renin–angiotensin system. Studies have shown that these drugs help suppress lupus nephritis in adults when combined with other drugs. For example, a regimen consisting of tacrolimus (4 mg per day), mycophenolate mofetil, and a glucocorticoid had a significantly higher response rate in treating adult lupus nephritis than a standard treatment regimen consisting of cyclophosphamide plus glucocorticoids. The incidence of adverse reactions to the two regimens was similar. It has therefore been suggested that regimens including a calcineurin inhibitor may be useful and should be studied for treating lupus nephritis in cSLE patients. Tacrolimus ointment, when topically applied at a dose of 1 gram per day, is used to treat mild to moderate skin rashes in cSLE.

Renin–angiotensin–aldosterone system inhibitors are angiotensin-converting-enzyme inhibitors (i.e., ACEi), angiotensin receptor blockers (i.e., ARB), aldosterone receptor antagonists (i.e. ARAn), and renin inhibitors some of which have been shown to reduce high blood pressures and proteinuria in aSLE. A preliminary review of 74 children 13–17 years old with lupus nephritis were treated with glucocorticoids with or without an ACEi, ARB, or ARAM. Patients receiving one of these inhibitors for a median time of 375 days showed improvements in their renal function that enabled stopping glucocorticoid treatment; cSLE patients that did not receive one of these inhibitors required a median time of 648 days before kidney function improved enough to stop taking a glucocorticoid. While further studies are needed, this study suggests that taking an ACEi, ARBm, or ARAn has the desirable effect of decreasing glucocorticoid intake and therefore the toxic effects of long-term glucocorticoid consumption (see renin-angiotensin-aldosterone system inhibitors.

Bortezomib given intravenously or subcutaneously reversed or greatly reduced cSLE-related encephalopathic neuropsychiatric disorders in a recent study of 5 patients. These disorders were auditory hallucinations and insomnia in all 5 patients, suicidal ideation in 4 of the patients, visual hallucinations in 3 of the patients, homicidal ideation in 2 of the patients, hyper-religiosity along with fabricated languages in 2 of the patients, high combativity in 2 of the patients, mania in 1 of the patients, a conversion disorder with echolalia, tinnitus, and tics in 1 of the patients, and anxiety along with a mood disorder in 1 of the patients. All 5 patients developed hypogammaglobulinemia (immunoglobulin G less than 500 mg per deciliter of blood) that required replacing the immunoglobulin for the 1–10 years that the patients were treated with bortezomib. Patient 3 had a brief episode of hypotension after the administration of intravenous bortezomib. Further studies are needed to confirm and expand these promising results.

==== Treatment of lupus nephritis ====
Lupus nephritis not only leads to kidney failure, it is also one of the most common as well as most serious and potentially lethal disorders in cSLE and aSLE. A 2002 report by a consensus conference of nephrologists, pathologists, and rheumatologists separated lupus nephritis into 6 classes in order to redefine the severity of its various classes and provide a pathophysiology-based approach for the diagnosis and treatment of the 6 classes. These classes and their respective treatments are:

- Class I, also termed minimal mesangial glomerulonephritis, has a good prognosis without specific treatment.
- Class II, also termed mesangial proliferative glomerulonephritis, presents with microscopic hematuria and/or proteinuria. It generally responds to high dosages of glucocorticoids.
- Class III, also termed focal proliferative nephritis, presents with hematuria, proteinuria, the nephrotic syndrome, and/or hypertension. It is treated with a glucocorticoid and an immunosuppressant drug such as mycophenolate mofetil or cyclophosphamide.
- Class IV, also termed diffuse proliferative nephritis, presents with hematuria, proteinuria, and hypertension. It is treated with a glucocorticoid and an immunosuppressant drug such as mycophenolate mofetil or cyclophosphamide.
- Class V, also termed membranous glomerulonephritis, presents with proteinuria and on occasion the nephrotic syndrome and anasarca (i.e., generalized edema). It has a better prognosis than Class III or IV disease and often spontaneously remits. It is recommended that a period of watchful waiting be used before considering immunosuppressive treatment with a) cyclophosphamide alternating with a glucocorticoid, b) an ACE1 inhibitor, or c) an ARB.
- Class VI, also termed advanced sclerosing lupus nephritis or Glomerulosclerosis, is poorly responsive to all therapies but progresses to kidney failure very slowly.

Class III and IV (also termed the proliferative lupus nephritises) have the worst prognoses and account for up to 75% of all lupus nephritis cases in cSLE. The International Society of Nephrology and Renal Pathology Society revised this classification in 2018 by dividing each class into levels of severity with increasing scores and defining their severity and treatments based on total scores. We use the 2002 classification because the studies reported here were based on it.

== Prognosis ==
The prognosis of cSLE and aSLE have improved over the past 50 years. The 10-year survival rate of cSLE patients treated in rheumatology multidisciplinary clinics rose from 78% in the 1970s to 85% in the 2000s. Similarly, the 10 year survival rates in Japan were 92.3% for 1980-1994 and 98.3% for 1995–2006. Recent studies using the standardized mortality ratio method reported that persons with cSLE and aSLE had respectively 18.3% and 3.1% higher mortality rates than their age-matched general populations Another study found that cSLE patients had a 19% higher mortality than their age-matched general population. The prognosis for progression of lupus nephritis has also improved since the 1980s with recent studies finding that the ten year kidney survival time (i.e., time from diagnosis to the development of kidney failure) was 86%. Nonetheless, a study in 2013 reported that cSLE patients with lupus nephritis had a 19-fold higher mortality rate while aSLE patients with lupus nephritis had an 8-fold higher mortality rate than their respective age-matched populations and a study in 2020 suggested that the survival rate of lupus nephritis in children and adults has not improved over the recent years. Since delayed diagnosis and treatment of lupus nephritis results in higher incidences of kidney failure, it should be quickly diagnosis and properly treated. As more patients have survived well past the early course of their disease, premature atherosclerosis has increasingly contributed to the mortality in cSLE and aSLE.
