= IFI44L =

Human gene

Identifiers
- Aliases: IFI44L, C1orf29, GS3686, interferon induced protein 44 like, TLDC5B
- External IDs: OMIM: 613975; MGI: 95975; GeneCards: IFI44L

Gene location (Human)
Chr.	Chromosome 1 (human)
Band	1p31.1	Start	78,619,902 bp
Band	1p31.1	End	78,646,145 bp

Gene location (Mouse)
Chr.	Chromosome 3 (mouse)
Band	3 H3|3 76.94 cM	Start	151,464,374 bp
Band	3 H3|3 76.94 cM	End	151,468,529 bp
RNA expression pattern
Bgee	Human / Mouse (ortholog); Top expressed in: monocyte; Achilles tendon; trigeminal ganglion; pericardium; gallbladder; spinal ganglia; palpebral conjunctiva; human penis; decidua; granulocyte / Top expressed in: urethra; thoracic ganglia; cervix; greater petrosal nerve; glossopharyngeal ganglion; ganglion of vagus nerve; blood; stellate ganglion; trachea; vestibular sensory epithelium; More reference expression data
BioGPS	n/a
Gene ontology
Molecular function	GTP binding; molecular function
Cellular component	cytoplasm; cellular component; nucleoplasm
Biological process	defense response to virus; immune response
Sources:Amigo / QuickGO
Orthologs
Databases	NCBI: entry; OMA: entry
Species	Human	Mouse
Entrez	10964	15061
Ensembl	ENSG00000137959	ENSMUSG00000039146
UniProt	Q53G44	Q9BDB7
RefSeq (mRNA)	NM_006820; NM_001375646; NM_001375647; NM_001375648; NM_001375649 NM_001375650	NM_031367
RefSeq (protein)	NP_006811; NP_001362575; NP_001362576; NP_001362577; NP_001362578 NP_001362579	NP_112735
Location (UCSC)	Chr 1: 78.62 – 78.65 Mb	Chr 3: 151.46 – 151.47 Mb
PubMed search
- Wikidata
View/Edit Human	View/Edit Mouse

The interferon-induced protein 44-like gene (i.e., IFI44L gene, also known as the GS3686, TLDC5B, and C1orf29 gene https://www.wikidata.org/wiki/Q18035986) codes for the interferon-induced protein 44-like protein (i.e., IFI44L protein). This gene is located in band 1, region 1 (see band and gene nomenclature) on the short, i.e., "p", arm of chromosome 1 (location abbreviated as 1p31.1). A closely related gene, the interferon-induced protein 44 gene (i.e. the IFI44 gene), is a paralog of the IFI44L gene (i.e., the two genes are duplicates of an ancestorial gene). The IFI44L and IFI44 proteins are composed of 452 and 444 amino acids, respectively, share 45% amino acid identity along with 60% homology at the amino acid level, and have many similar or overlapping functions and activities. This article focuses on the function and clinical significance of the IFI44L gene and the IFI44L protein that it directs to be formed.

The IFI444L gene is an interferon-stimulated gene in which type I interferons stimulate it to transcribe, i.e., make, its messenger RNA (mRNA) which in turn directs formation of the IFI44L protein. Type I interferons are cytokines which immune cells secrete in response to the accumulation of cytoplasmic DNA that occurs in microbe-infected cells, cancer cells, and cells with other types of injuries or abnormalities. Humans have 13 different type I interferon-α proteins: type I interferon-α1, -α2, - α4, -α5, -α6, -α7, -α8, - α10, -α13, - α14, -α16, -α17, -α21, and 4 other type I interferon proteins, type I interferon-β, -ε, -κ, and -Ω. These interferons bind to and stimulate the interferon-alpha/beta receptors located in a wide range of cells which when so stimulated act to promote or inhibit the inflammatory reactions associated with a various diseases and disorders including certain infections, cancers, genetic disorders, and autoimmune diseases. Diseases and disorders promoted by the type I interferons are termed interferon type I interferonopathies. Among the many genes that they influence, type I interferons stimulate cells to transcribe the IFI44L gene (see interferon-alpha/beta signaling) thereby increasing production of the IFI44L protein. Alterations in the expression of the IFI44L gene may be helpful in diagnosing and estimating the severity of various diseases and disorders and in some cases suggest that it may be targeted (i.e., stimulated or inhibited from forming IFI44L protein) to alter their development and/or progression.

== Diseases and disorders associated with IFI44L gene abnormalities ==
=== Viral infections ===
==== Respiratory syncytial virus infections ====
A 2016 study reviewing former publications on type I interferon-stimulated genes in lung infections caused by the respiratory syncytial virus (i.e., RSV) reported that the IFI44L gene was overexpressed in: a) the whole blood, peripheral blood mononuclear cells (i.e., PBMCs), oral mucosa, nasal mucosa, respiratory epithelium, and nasopharyngeal aspirates (i.e., suctions) of patients hospitalized for RSV infections; b) the cord blood of RSV-infected newborn infants; c) several different cultured human immortalized cell lines after being infected with RSV; and d) the lung tissue and whole blood of mice after being infected with RSV. A subsequent study found that: a) RSV stimulated cultured A549 cells (i.e., immortalized cells derived from human adenocarcinoma lung cells) to increase their IFI44L mRNA levels; b) intranasal injection of RSV into BALB/c mice increased the levels of IFI44L mRNA in their PBMCs; c) intranasal injection of RSV into C57BL/6N mice (i.e., mice that lack the IFI44L gene) developed greater weight losses and higher levels of RSV mRNA in their lung tissue than C57BL/6 mice (i.e., mice that have the IFI44L gene); d) cultured A549 cells that had their IFI44R gene disabled using gene knockout methods proliferated more rapidly than A549 cells that did not have this disablement; e) forced overexpression of the IFI44L gene in cultured 549 cells decreased their rate of proliferation; f) cultured A549 cells made to overexpress IFI44L mRNA had a lower percentage of cells that could be infected with RSV and a lower number of RSV recovered from their cultures; g) cultures of A549 cells made to express low levels of IFI44L mRNA and infected with RSV developed 2-fold higher levels of RSV than cultures of RSV-infected cells that expressed normal levels of IFI44L mRNA; and h) following intranasal inoculation with RSV, C57BL/6N mice, which lack functional IFI44L and IIFI44 genes, developed a far more severe RSV infection that mice lacking only one of these genes. The study also reported that 12 infants with severe RSV infections who were admitted to a hospital had significantly lower levels of IFI44L and IFI44 mRNA in their PBMCs than 6 infants with mild RSV who were admitted to this hospital. The study concluded that: a) high expression of the IFI44L gene reduces the growth of RSV and RSV-infected cells in cultured human lung cells and in mice; b) the increased expression of the IFI44L gene in infants infected with RSV is associated with significantly less severe disease than infants who expressed lower levels of the IFI44L gene; c) further studies are needed to confirm that overexpression of the IFI44L gene is associated with less severe RSV infections in infants infected with RSV, to determine if the IFI44L gene is overexpressed in children and adults with less severe RSV, to determine if the levels of this gene's expression would be useful for predicting the severity of RSV infection, and to determine if methods that promote overexpression of the IFI44L gene would be useful in treating RSV infections.

==== Influenza A virus, coronavirus, lymphocytic choriomeningitis virus, and COVID19 infections ====
In contrast to the findings in RSV infections, cultured A549 cells infected with the Influenza A virus or the lymphocytic choriomeningitis virus and cultured Huh7 human liver cancer cells infected with the human coronavirus 229E: a) had far higher IFI44L mRNA levels than mock-infected cells; b) had reduced numbers of these viruses in their respective cells when their IFI44L genes were knocked out (i.e., deleted or inactivated); and c) knocking out the IFI44L gene also suppressed the expression of two interferon-induced proteins, IFIT2 and IFN-λ1. (IFIT2 and IFN-λ1 inhibit the growth and replication of various viruses.) These results indicate that the IFI44L protein promotes the proliferation of these three viruses in their respective cultured cells and appears to do so by inhibiting them from making two inhibitors of viral growth/proliferation, i.e., the type I interferon-stimulated IFIT2 protein and type III interferon-simulated IFN-λ1 protein. A study of 32 patients who had SARS-CoV-2, (a form of coronavirus that causes COVID-19) for 5 to 17 weeks reported that 15 patients with symptomatic covid-19 disease had significantly higher peripheral blood cell levels of IFI44L mRNA than 17 patients who did not develop symptoms of this infection. The study suggested that high blood cell levels IFI44L mRNA (and therefore IFI44L protein) contributes to the development of symptoms in patients with COVID-19 infections. An epigenome-wide association study on the DNA methylation of genes in individuals with Covid-19 reported that CpG sites (i.e., cytosine-phosphate-guanine sites) in a promotor (identified as the cg03607951 site ) of the IFI44L gene in the blood cells of 109 patients with Covid-19 had significantly lower levels of cytosine methylation than 71 non-infected individuals. Low levels of cytosine methylation in a gene's CPG promotor are usually associated with increases in the expression of this promotor's gene. This study supported the conclusion that high levels of IFI44L promote the development of symptomatic Covid-19 in humans.

==== Hepatitis B virus ====
Hepatitis B virus (i.e., HBV) causes a form of chronic hepatitis that may lead to cirrhosis, cancer, and failure of the liver. HBV is a DNA virus that infects hepatocytes (i.e., liver cells) as a virion particle with its genetic material in the form of relaxed, circular DNA (i.e., rcDNA). Once inside the hepatocyte, it replicates by converting its rcDNA to covalently closed circular DNA (i.e., cccDNA: see rcDNA and cccDNA). cccDNA forms the proteins that transcribe the HBV DNA into mRNA and translate this mRNA into proteins that make HBV virions which leave the cell to infect other hepatocytes. As of 2024, there were 7 drugs licensed to treat chronic HBV hepatitis B infection in the United States(see treatment of chronic HBV hepatitis). These drugs suppress the replication of HBV but do not remove all of the HBV cccDNA, i.e., these drugs as well as various experimental treatments do not completely eliminate or inactivate cccDNA and therefore do not cure HBV-induced hepatitis. A study quantified the replication of HBV virions made by cultured Hep G2 human hepatocellular carcinoma cells by: a) infecting cultured Hep G2 cells with a form of HBV that causes severe liver damage in humans; b) adding the extracellular media of these Hep G2 cultures to cultures of PXB cells (i.e., human hepatocytes isolated from humanized PBX-mice); c) treating the cultured PXB cells with IFN-α, IFN-γ, or interferon-free culture medium on days 4, 8, 13, 18, and 23; and d) measuring the effects of these treatments on various indicators of HBV production. The culture media from untreated Hep G2 cells caused the PXB cells to develop progressively increasing levels of HBV virions and the HBsAg surface antigen of these virions over this 23 day period while the PXB cells, which were examined at day 23, developed increased levels of cccDNA, HBsAg, and HBV virions. In contrast, PXB cells treated with IFN-α or IFN-γ had increased levels of IFI44L mRNA and decreased levels of cccDNA, HBsAg and HBV virions while their media had decreased levels of HBV virions and HBsAg surface antigen. PXB cells that had their IFI44L partially knocked down showed far less of these IFN-α- and IFN-γ-induced changes. Thus, activation of the IFI44L gene appeared to suppress the intracellular replication of HBV and support studies to determine if it can be used to cure HBV infections in animal models and humans.

==== Early childhood respiratory tract infections ====
Children less than 2 years old have high rates (average 6/year) of respiratory tract infections (RTIs) that are mostly caused by viruses and often complicated by otitis media (i.e., middle ear infections) caused by viruses or bacteria. Two studies conducted in Finland, the STEPS Study and FinnBrain Birth Cohort Study, reported that the rates and severities of these RTIs differed in children who carried different single nucleotide polymorphism (i.e., SNIP) IFI44L gene variants. (A SNIP gene is a gene that has two different nucleic acid sequences only one of which is carried by an individual.) These IFI44L variants were: a) rs273259, a missense gene variant (i.e. a variant that causes a change in the amino acid sequence of the protein) in exon 2 of the IFI44L gene that has a guanine rather than adenine nucleotide thereby coding for a histidine rather than arginine at position 73 in the IFI44L protein (change notated as His73Arg); and b) rs1333969 which has an intronic change (i.e., a change that does not alter the amino acid sequence of the IFI44L protein) in the IFI44L gene.https://www.ncbi.nlm.nih.gov/snp/rs1333969/ In the STEPS study, children with the rs273259 or rs1333969 forms of the IFI44L gene had a decreased number of days they had RTI symptoms and a decreased rate of developing acute otitis media from birth to 2 years of age. In the FinnBrain Birth Cohort Study, children with the rs273259 and rs1333969 variants of this gene had a decreased rate of developing RTIs during their first year of life. Children with either variant had significant decreases in the expression of the IFI44L protein. The study concluded that these variant IFI44L genes reduced the expression or their IFI44L proteins and these reductions were associated with decreased rates of developing RTIs and acute otitis media.

==== Other viral infections ====
Studies have shown that the IFI44L mRNA in the peripheral blood or certain peripheral blood cells is elevated in: a) 11 febrile children aged 1 to 6.4 years old with various viral infections; b) 92 children (median age 1.5 years) with various viral infections; and c) 212 adult patients with an acute febrile illness caused by various viruses. These studies concluded that the peripheral blood and certain peripheral blood cells develop increases in IFI44L mRNA in patients with a wide range of viral infections and support further studies to show that measuring blood IFI44L mRNA levels are useful for distinguishing viral from bacterial infections in infants, children, and adults (the section "Distinguishing between viral from bacterial infections" reports on studies finding that many bacterial infections are not associated with significant increases in the expression of the IFI44L gene).

=== Bacterial infections ===
==== Mycobacterium tuberculosis ====
A study testing the function of the IFI44L gene in Mycobacterium tuberculosis (which causes tuberculosis, i.e., TB) reported that cultures of a macrophage cell line derived from the THP-1 human monocytic cell line developed higher IFI44L mRNA levels and lower levels of four inflammation-promoting cytokines, (i.e., CCL4, CXCL10, CXCL11, and IL18) after being infected with the H37Rv strain of mycobacterium tuberculosis. The survival of these mycobacteria was greatly increased in macrophages that had their IFI44L gene knocked out. In addition, the levels of IFI44L mRNA rose while the survival of H37Rv mycobacteria and levels of the cited inflammatory cytokines fell in macrophages pretreated with rifampicin, a mycobacterium-killing drug. Furthermore, rifampicin-based anti-tuberculosis drug treatment of 10 patients who had the cutaneous form of TB for 1 to 6 months caused decreases in their skin lesions and decreases in their PMBCs levels of IFI44L mRNA, IFI44L protein, and the cited cytokines. Other studies have reported that: 176 patients with TB had higher levels of IFI44L mRNA in their peripheral blood than 215 heathy individuals; 195 patients with TB had higher levels of IFI44L mRNA in their peripheral blood than 210 healthy controls; 84 patients with TB had higher levels of IFI44L mRNA in their peripheral blood than 81 healthy individuals; and 20 patients with TB had higher levels of IFI44L mRNA in the peripheral blood than 19 healthy patient. These studies indicate that the IFI44L gene is overexpressed in patients with tuberculosis, suggest that the IFI44L protein clears mycobacterium from cultured macrophages and mycobacterial skin lesions at least in part by promoting the production of pro-inflammatory cytokines, and support future studies to determine if the IFI44L gene is a target for therapeutic strategies (e.g., increasing its activation) to treat Mycobacterium tuberculosis and a useful biomarker for determining the effectiveness of antituberculosis therapy.

==== Other bacterial infections ====
Studies suggest that, except for Mycobacterium tuberculosis, many types of bacterial infections are not associated with appreciable activation of the IFI44L gene as defined by rises in IFI44l mRNA, at lease as compared to viral infections levels. However, these studies often did not define the types of bacteria examined and included only a small number of bacterial types (see next section on "Distinguishing between viral and bacterial infections).

=== Distinguishing viral from bacterial infections ===
A study reported that the peripheral blood levels of IFI44L mRNA were higher and Fam89A mRNA were lower in 47 young children with proven viral compared to 33 patients with proven bacterial infections. This study used a disease risk score (i.e., DRC, a number summarizing a person's risk of developing a particular disease) which it defined as the sum of the levels of these two mRNAs. This DRC clearly distinguished viral from bacterial infections in these children. A second study examined 30 children 0.6–15 years old who, while being treated with chemotherapy for cancer, presented with neutropenia plus clinical evidence of having a viral or bacterial infection. The study used a DRC it defined by subtracting the normalized log2 expression value of IFI44L from the normalized log2 expression value of FAM89A. (Normalized Log2 expression values convert mRNA levels into numbers more easily compared and analyzed. see binary logarithm). In this study, a higher DRC score correctly indicated a bacterial infection in 17 patients and a lower DRC correctly indicated a viral infection in 13 children. A third study using this DRC found that 89 neonates and infants less than 60 days old who had a high DRC were correctly diagnosed as having a bacterial infection and 111 neonates and infants less than 60 days old who had a low DRC correctly diagnosed a viral infection with a high degree accuracy (95.7%). A fourth study on children less than 14 years of age with a bacterial (39 patients) or viral (59 patients) febrile illness were correctly diagnosed using the latter DRS with an accuracy of 82.5%. Taken together, these studies suggest that the cited DRC measurements of IFI44L and Fam89A mRNA levels in the blood of children, infants, and neonates with the signs and symptoms of an acute infection can significantly contribute to determining whether an infection is bacterial or viral in origin.

=== Cancers ===
==== Squamous-cell carcinoma of the head and neck ====
Squamous-cell carcinomas of the head and neck are cancers derived from the mucosal epithelium in the oral cavity, pharynx (which includes the hypopharynx), or larynx. They consist mostly of and therefore are collectively termed head and neck squamous cell carcinomas, i.e., HNSCCs. A study reported that the cells in patient HNSCCs had significantly higher levels of IFI44L protein (as defined using antibodies directed at this protein) than cells in nearby normal head and neck epithelium tissues. Similarly, three immortalized human cell lines, FaDu cells (i.e., cells derived from a human squamous cell carcinoma of the hypopharynx), HSC‐3 cells (i.e., cells derived from a human tongue cancer), and SAS cells (i.e., cells derived from a human tongue squamous cell carcinoma) had higher IFI44L protein levels than HOK cells (i.e., cells derived from human non-cancerous oral keratinocytes). Long-chain-fatty-acid—CoA ligase 4, also termed long‐chain acyl‐CoA synthetase 4 or ACSL4, is an enzyme that converts fatty acids to their fatty acyl-CoA esters. It is also implicated in increasing the invasiveness, migration, and survival of cultured colon, prostate, breast, lung, and brain cancer immortalized cell lines. Similar to IFI44L, ACSL4 protein levels were higher in patient's HNSCC tumor tissues than their nearby normal head and neck epithelial tissues. Furthermore, patients with HNSCC tumors that expressed higher levels of ACSL4 protein had significantly shorter survival times than patients with lower ACSL4 protein levels. Finally, cultured OECM‐1 (a human oral squamous carcinoma cell line), SAS, and HSC‐3 cells that had their ACSL4 protein levels reduced using short hairpin RNAs showed significantly decreased levels of IFI44L as well as their rates of proliferation, migration, and invasiveness than the same cell lines that were treated with inactive short hairpin RNAs. Thus, high IFI44L protein levels promote the malignant behavior of cultured HNSCC tumor cells; high levels of ACSL4 and IFI44L are associated with increased aggressiveness of HNSCCs and shorter survival times in patients with HNSCCs; these actions of high ACSL4 levels may be caused at least in part by its increasing IFI44L levels; and IFI44L and ACSL4 may prove useful parameters of disease severity as well as potential therapeutic targets for treating HNSCC. In two other studies, IFI44L mRNA levels were found to be higher in patient nasopharyngeal carcinomas than normal nasopharyngeal tissues based on a large number of samples in the Gene Expression Omnibus and IFI44L mRNA levels were reported to be significantly higher in 209 patient oral squamous cell carcinomas than normal oral tissues with carcinomas having higher levels of IFI44L mRNA being associated with poorer overall survival rates.

==== Hepatocellular carcinoma ====
A study reviewing 217 patients with hepatocellular carcinoma in China reported that the levels of IFI44L protein in their carcinomas were significantly lower in patients who had larger tumor sizes, advanced stage disease, disease relapses, and/or shorter survival times. This study also examined cultures of human Hep3B, Hep G2, and PLC hepatocarcinoma cells or the stem cells cells isolated from these hepatocarcinoma Immortalised cell lines.(Stem cells are a small subset of cells in cancers that self-renew, continuously proliferate, form tumors, metastasize, and maintain tumor heterogeneity.) These culture cell studies showed that the forced overexpression of IFI44L protein by transfection with a plasmid containing the human IFI44L gene into Hep3B cells, Hep G2 cells, or the stem cells isolated from these two cell lines increased their sensitivity to the lethal effects of doxorubicin; reducing IFI44L protein levels using small interfering RNA restored these cells' resistance to this chemotherapy drug. Finally, depletion of the IFI44L gene in cultures of Hep3B, Hep G2, and PLC cells using a gene knockdown method enhanced their migration and invasiveness as measured by in vitro assays as well as pulmonary metastasis as measured by injecting these cells into 6-8-week-old severe combined immunodeficient mice. These results suggest that the IFI44L gene is a tumor suppressor gene for hepatocellular carcinoma at least in the cited Chinese population and, if confirmed in future studies including those conducted outside of China, would indicate that INI44L protein levels can be used as a predictive biomarker of hepatocellular disease severity and a promising therapeutic target (i.e., by increasing its levels) for treating hepatocellular carcinomas.

==== Non-small cell lung cancer ====
A study of two non-small cell lung cancer forms, i.e., lung adenocarinoma (LAD) and lung squamous cell carcinoma (LSC), reported that: a) cell culture assays on the growth, proliferation, and invasiveness of two human lung cancer immortalized cell lines representing LAD and LSC cells, i.e. SPC-A-1 and NCI-H520 cells, respectively, were inhibited by forcing these cells to overexpress the IFI44L gene; b) IFI44L mRNA levels were significantly lower in 497 LAD and 489 LSC patient tissues than in normal lung tissues; c) the levels of IFI44L mRNA in LAD and LSC patient tissues increased with increases in the numbers of inflammation-producing and potentially tumor-suppressing immune cell types in these tissues but decreased with the number of relatively inactive or tumor tolerance-promoting types of immune cells in these tissues; and d) dividing LAD and LSC into high and low scores based on the number and types of immune cells in patient LAD and LSC tissues successfully classified patients into low risk and high risk groups with the low risk group having a longer overall survival rate than patients in the high risk group. These studies indicate that overexpression of the IFI44L gene inhibits the growth of cultured SOC-A-1 (i.e., LAD-like) and NCI-h520 (i.e., LSC-like) forms of non-small cell lung cancer, that treatments which stimulate the IFI44L gene may be therapeutically useful for treating these cancers, and that measurements of the levels of the various immune cell types in these cancers may prove to be useful indicators of these tumors' aggressiveness and patient survivals. A subsequent study found that non-malignant human bronchial epithelial cells (i.e., HBE cells) responded to treatment with a cancer-causing chemical, 3-methylcholanthrene, by significantly decreasing their levels of IFI44L mRNA and protein. This study also showed that: a) compared to normal lung tissue, the levels of IFI44L mRNA and IFI44L protein were low and methylations of the IFI44L gene at three sites (i.e., cg17980508, cg03607951, and cg27315157) were increased in 486 cases of human lung adenocarcinoma; b) expression of the IFI44L gene was decreased in adenocarcinoma tissues with higher levels of methylation at these three IFI44L gene sites; c) the forced overexpression of IFI44L mRNA in two human lung cancer cell lines that express low levels of IFI44L mRNA, i.e., SPC-A1 cells (cells with characteristics of cancer stem cells) and LTEP-a-2 cells (i.e., cells used in Asian studies of lung cancer) decreased their rate of proliferation and increased their apoptosis (i.e., cell death) while knockdown of the IFI44L gene in A549 cells, which normally express high levels of IFI44L, increased their rate of proliferation and decreased their apoptosis; and d) in a model of in vivo cancer cell growth, nude mice (i.e., mice with a defective immune system) that were subcutaneously injected with human lung cancer cells which overexpressed the IFI44Lgene grew more slowly than the tumors produced by the injection of human cancer cells that did not overexpress the IFI44l gene. These studies indicated that the IFI44L gene functions to inhibit the growth of certain types of human lung cancer cells in culture as well as in mice and suggest that this gene is a tumor suppressor gene.

==== Other cancers ====
A review of early stage lung cancers (127 patients), breast cancers (94 patients), and melanomas (15 patients) reported that the peripheral blood monocytes of these patients overexpressed the IFI44L protein compared to similar tissues taken form 148, 31, and 13, respectively, healthy individuals. While these results require further and independent validation, they suggest that high levels of the IFI44L protein may prove to be a useful biomarker for identifying these types of solid cancers at an early and perhaps more treatable stage.

=== Genetic disorders ===
==== Aicardi–Goutières syndrome ====
The Aicardi–Goutières syndrome (i.e., AGS) is a rare childhood genetic disorder caused by certain mutations in the TREX1, RNASEH2B, RNASEH2C, RNASEH2A, ADAR1, SAMHD1, IFIH1, LSM11, or RNU7-1 gene. Symptoms of the disease are most often detected in infants around 4 months of age but may be detectable in embryos. These mutations lead to increased type I interferon production thereby triggering autoimmune inflammation-induced damage to nervous tissues that result in cerebral atrophy, various encephalopathies, spastic paraplegia, strokes, microcephaly, intellectual disability, epilepsy, bradykinesia (i.e., slowness in initiating voluntary movements), and/or dystonia (i.e., involuntary, repetitive muscle contractions). The elevated levels of type I interferons may also trigger inflammation-induced skin disorders such as chilblain-like lesions, acrocyanosis, fingernail abnormalities, the Raynaud syndrome, and/or endocrine diseases such as diabetes insipidus, diabetes mellitus, hyperparathyroidism, growth hormone deficiency, and adrenal insufficiency. A recent study showed that the blood levels of IFI44L mRNA: a) in 334 AGS patients were higher than those for 35 other interferon signaling genes and b) higher in 165 samples of patients with AGS compared to 574 samples of patients without AGS. The study suggested that elevated IFI44L mRNA blood levels may be a useful marker for diagnosing AGS. A study conducted in Italy examined patients with AGS caused by a mutation in the RNASEH2B gene. In addition to this mutation, 5 patients had a c.529G>A,p.A177T mutation in exon 7 of their two RNASEH2B genes. In this mutation, the guanine (G) nucleotide at gene position 529 is replaced by an adenine (A) nucleotide to result in changing the amino acid from alanine (A) to threonine (T) at position 177 in the mutated RNASEH2B protein. Five AGS patients who had this mutation in both of their RNASEH2B genes suffered far more severe forms of AGS than patients with this mutation in jnust one of their RNASEM2B genes. Patients with the adenine form of RNASEH2B mutated protein in both genes had low levels of methylation in the promotor regions of the IFI44L gene and significantly higher levels of IFI44L mRNA in their peripheral blood mononuclear cells. If these findings are confirmed in future studies, the authors suggest that high levels of IFI44L mRNA would be useful marker to diagnose AGS and support studies to determine if suppressing the expression of the IFI44L gene would be useful for treating AGS.

=== Autoimmune diseases ===
==== Systemic lupus erythematosus ====
As reviewed by Zhao et al, four studies found that IFI44L mRNA was more highly expressed in the peripheral blood monocytes, T helper cells, and B cells of patients with systemic lupus erythematosus (i.e., SLE) than healthy controls as measured using Affymetrix gene microarray chips. The review concluded that measuring the expression of IFI44L may be a useful step in diagnosing SLE. This conclusion was supported by two studies reporting that SLE patients had significantly higher levels of IFI44L mRNA in their peripheral blood or peripheral blood mononuclear cells than healthy individuals. Similarly, a study of the Gene Expression Omnibus data set reported that 133 patients with SLE had higher levels of IFI44L mRNA in various types of their circulating blood cells compared to 62 healthy individuals. A study of 1,521 patients with SLE, 782 patients with rheumatoid arthritis (i.e., RA), 199 patients with Sjögren's syndrome (i.e., SS), and 1,703 healthy individuals reported that the peripheral blood mononuclear cells of SLE patients had significantly lower DNA methylation levels in two promoter areas identified as Site1 (Chr1: 79 085 222) and Site2 (Chr1: 79 085 250; cg06872964) of their IFI44L genes than: a) RA patients, b) primary SS (i.e., pSS) patients (i.e., patients with SS that is not accompanied by any other systemic autoimmune disease), and c) healthy individuals. Low methylation levels at gene promotors usually increase the expression of their gene's mRNA and protein. A follow-up study found that the methylation levels in the IFI44L gene promotor were also lower in SLE patients than patients with discoid lupus erythematosus (i.e., a cutaneous and less severe form of SLE). The two studies suggested that low levels of methylations in the cited IFI44L gene promotor areas may be useful for diagnosing SLE and distinguishing SLE from RA, pSS, and discoid lupus erythematosus. A review of studies published up to July 2022 found 7 other reports showing that IFI44L gene promotor methylations were lower in SLE patients than healthy individuals. However, 2 of these 7 reports (both done in Iran) found that IFI44L promotor methylations were also lower in patients with rheumatoid arthritis than heathy individuals. (As indicated in the next two sections, individuals with SS or RA overexpress the IFI44L gene.) This and another review concluded that low methylation levels in an IFI44L gene promoter are a promising diagnostic biomarkers for SLE but further studies are needed to determine if a) these low levels do in fact discriminate SLE from RA, pSS, or other autoimmune diseases that can be mistaken for SLE and b) are related to the severity of SLE (e.g., is IFI44L promoter methylation low in mild cases of SLE?). Finally, a recent study found that 36 of 49 children with childhood-onset SLE had lower methylation levels in a promoter region of their IFI44L gene (measured in the children's whole blood) than those of 12 healthy children. The study suggested that, while further studies are needed, IFI44l promoter methylation levels in children appear similar to those found in adults.

==== Sjögren's Syndrome ====
Sjögren's syndrome (i.e., SS; also termed Sjögren's disease) is an autoimmune disease that typically involves inflammation-induce injuries to exocrine glands, particularly the lacrimal and salivary glands but also other organs such as the liver, kidney, and lung. Patients with primary SS (i.e., pSS) have an increased incidence of developing various cancers such as non-Hodgkin lymphoma, Hodgkin lymphoma, multiple myeloma, various leukemias, and cancers of the thyroid gland, skin (but not melanoma skin cancer), kidney, urinary tract, liver, and prostate gland. An analysis of the parotid tissue of 18 patients with pSS found that it contained higher levels of IFI44L mRNA than the parotid's of 17 healthy individuals. This overexpression of the IFI44L gene was confirmed in studies that examined the parotid glands of 18 SS and 17 healthy individuals, the minor salivary glands of 9 SS and 8 healthy individuals, the blood mononuclear cells of 16 SS and 11 healthy individuals, the blood of 30 SS and 30 healthy individuals, and analyses of several Genome-wide association studies which found that 36 pSS patients had higher levels of IFI44L in various cell types of their peripheral blood compared to 24 healthy individuals. These studies suggested that overexpression of the IFI44L gene may be a useful marker for diagnosing and a potential target for treating SS. Finally, four other studies supported these conclusions by finding that the IFI44L gene was highly overexpressed in SS.

==== Rheumatoid arthritis ====
A study of 98 patients with Rheumatoid arthritis (i.e., RA) and 75 patients with SLE found that their peripheral blood contained significantly higher levels of IFI44L mRNA than 28 healthy individuals and that the IFI44L mRNA levels were significantly higher in SLE than RA patients. A study of DNA methylation in the IFI44L gene promoter in the peripheral blood mononuclear cells of 63 individuals with RA were significantly lower than that of 71 healthy individuals. Other studies reported that patients with higher combination scores for the mRNA of IFI44L, MxA, OAS1, IFI6 and ISG15 genes in their peripheral whole blood and peripheral blood mononuclear cells developed within 6 months a more severe form of RA than patients with lower combination scores for these 5 interferon-stimulated genes. The study suggested that measurements of these 5 genes' expression may prove useful for determining the severity of RA. Another study reported that the peripheral blood mononuclear cells of 35 RA patients had higher mRNA levels for the IFI44L, MX1, DTX3L, and PARP9 genes than 35 healthy individuals and suggested that these 4 interferon-stimulated genes are hub genes (i.e., genes that interact with other genes and thereby play essential roles in regulating other genes and various biological functions).
