= EMP2 =

Protein-coding gene in the species Homo sapiens

Identifiers
- Aliases: EMP2, NPHS10, XMP, epithelial membrane protein 2
- External IDs: OMIM: 602334; MGI: 1098726; HomoloGene: 1089; GeneCards: EMP2; OMA:EMP2 - orthologs

Gene location (Human)
Chr.	Chromosome 16 (human)
Band	16p13.13	Start	10,528,422 bp
Band	16p13.13	End	10,580,632 bp

Gene location (Mouse)
Chr.	Chromosome 16 (mouse)
Band	16 A1|16 5.54 cM	Start	10,099,613 bp
Band	16 A1|16 5.54 cM	End	10,131,832 bp
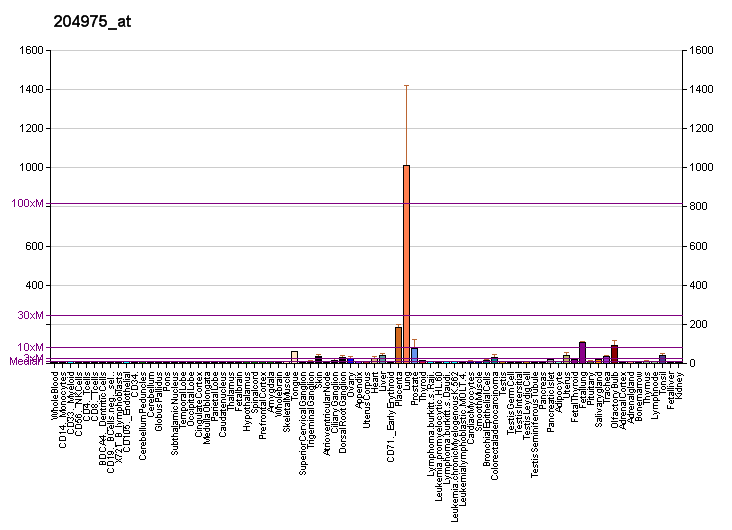
RNA expression pattern
Bgee	Human / Mouse (ortholog); Top expressed in: skin of thigh; skin of arm; lower lobe of lung; vulva; right lung; upper lobe of lung; upper lobe of left lung; nipple; gingival epithelium; human penis / Top expressed in: right lung lobe; left lung; left lung lobe; hair follicle; skin of external ear; lip; skin of abdomen; esophagus; transitional epithelium of urinary bladder; calvaria; More reference expression data
BioGPS	More reference expression data
Gene ontology
Molecular function	protein kinase binding; kinase binding; protein binding; integrin binding
Cellular component	caveola; cytoplasm; Golgi apparatus; Golgi membrane; nucleus; apical part of cell; apical plasma membrane; membrane; cell surface; membrane raft; plasma membrane; cytoplasmic vesicle; integral component of membrane; cytosol
Biological process	regulation of kinase activity; cell death; T cell mediated cytotoxicity; regulation of glomerular filtration; regulation of angiogenesis; positive regulation of cell-matrix adhesion; cell-matrix adhesion; actin filament organization; bleb assembly; protein localization to plasma membrane; early endosome to late endosome transport; positive regulation of cell population proliferation; regulation of cell-matrix adhesion; membrane raft assembly; caveola assembly; cell migration; regulation of endothelial cell migration; activation of protein kinase activity; protein localization to cell surface; actin-mediated cell contraction; positive regulation of integrin-mediated signaling pathway; regulation of vasculogenesis; cell adhesion; blood vessel endothelial cell migration; cell population proliferation; embryo implantation
Sources:Amigo / QuickGO
Orthologs
Species	Human	Mouse
Entrez	2013	13731
Ensembl	ENSG00000213853	ENSMUSG00000022505
UniProt	P54851	O88662
RefSeq (mRNA)	NM_001424	NM_007929
RefSeq (protein)	NP_001415	NP_031955
Location (UCSC)	Chr 16: 10.53 – 10.58 Mb	Chr 16: 10.1 – 10.13 Mb
PubMed search
- Wikidata
View/Edit Human	View/Edit Mouse

Epithelial membrane protein 2 is a protein that in humans is encoded by the EMP2 gene.

== Clinical significance ==
Mutations in EMP2 cause childhood-onset nephrotic syndrome.
