= Music Business Association =

Not-for-profit trade association

- Formation: 1958; 68 years ago
- Type: Nonprofit
- Headquarters: Nashville, Tennessee
- President: Portia Sabin
- Website: https://musicbiz.org/
- Formerly called: National Association of Recording Merchandisers

The Music Business Association (Music Biz), formerly known as the National Association of Recording Merchandisers (NARM), is a not-for-profit trade association based in Nashville, Tennessee. It hosts in-person and virtual events related to music business, offering educational materials, and fostering engagement opportunities for its members. Music Biz's membership includes major and independent record labels, streaming services, music retailers, distributors, music tech companies and startups, publishers, lawyers, and all others involved in the sale of music and related merchandise. Representing more than 90 percent of the industry at large, Music Biz provides opportunities for collaboration between professionals from all subsets to invest in the future of the entire music business while also addressing each business segment's individual needs.

== History ==
Established in 1958 as the National Association of Recording Merchandisers (NARM), the Association changed its name to the Music Business Association in October 2013 while also folding in digitalmusic.org, its home for online music initiatives. According to James Donio, the Association's president at the time of the rebrand, the change was made because "more segments of the business than ever before now play an active role in the commerce side of the business, so the name 'National Association of Recording Merchandisers' no longer reflected everyone who can participate in the organization... for the first time in the organization's history, the 'M' stands for music."

=== Response to COVID-19 pandemic and calls for social justice ===
With the COVID-19 pandemic effectively shutting down all in-person events and conferences for the better part of two years, Music Biz was not able to host its Annual Conference in 2020 or 2021. Instead, the organization pivoted its normal annual programming into a slate of more than 70 virtual events spread across the two-year period. This included the debut of its Music Biz LIVE interview series held over Zoom. These hour-long talks initially served as a way to check in with various music industry subsets on how the COVID-19 pandemic was affecting them and what responses they took to combat its effects on their businesses and personnel.

In addition, Music Biz hosted virtual, standalone versions of its most popular programming blocks from its Annual Conference, including its Metadata Summit, Podcasting Summit, Financial Literacy Summit, and #NEXTGEN_NOW young industry professionals event, among others. It also held four editions of the #NEXTGEN_U Summit, programmed with discussions that support the specific needs of music business students and educators.

In response to the calls across the music industry for a renewed focus on social justice initiatives and DEI efforts, Music Biz partnered with a number of organizations including Nashville Music Equality, the National Museum of African American Music (NMAAM), to host forums where the difficult conversations around ending racism in the music industry and supporting a global shift towards acceptance and equity. These included its first-ever "Driving Change" event, a handful of Music Biz LIVE interviews, and standalone events which focused on the needs of minority communities and what steps music industry executives could do in the present to institute meaningful change.

Outside of events, the Association prepared a running list of resources their members and the industry at large could use to support themselves during the height of the pandemic. These included government grant applications, funding for mental health services, and links to community chats for industry professionals to support one another's business endeavors or personnel needs.

== Member benefits ==
=== Events ===
The Association's in-person event slate includes the Music Biz Annual Conference, the Association's flagship event; The NY:LON Global Music Business Summit, in association with Music Ally, which alternates between New York City and London every year; the Let's Talk Physical seminars for members of the independent music retail community; the Metadata Summit, held bi-annually during the Association's Annual Conference and in a virtual format each fall; the #NEXTGEN_U Student Summit for those enrolled in music business higher education programs.

=== Education ===
Music Biz offers educational resources. These resources include webinars hosted by member companies; interviews with industry professionals conducted on The Future of What podcast; op-ed articles and Q&A's with industry thought leaders, curated daily news and industry analysis feeds; and trend reports provided by the Association's network of research partners.

The Association also supports future industry professionals through its Academic Partnership program. When a college or university becomes an academic partner, all students and teachers in music business, technology, or entertainment law programs gain access to a slate of benefits tailored specifically for the academic community.

Students at Academic Partner institutions, as well as the family members of member company employees, are eligible to apply for financial aid via Music Biz's Scholarship Foundation. Since its founding in 1966, the Foundation has raised over $9 million to support the costs of higher education for the industry's future leaders.

=== Empowerment ===
The organization brings together action committees to address major issues affecting the music industry as a whole, providing funds to its members in need of mental health services, and through its Scholarship Foundation and Academic Partnership program which support the needs of the academic community.

== Governance ==
Music Biz has been helmed since September 2019 by its president, Dr. Portia Sabin. For her efforts to both lead the organization during the tumultuous first year of the COVID-19 pandemic and reinvent the organization to best support the needs of all players in the global music business, Sabin was named to Billboard's 2021 Change Agents and 2022 and 2023 Women in Music lists. As of May 2023, the executives which comprise the current board are more than 50% female and 60% BIPOC, an important milestone given the Association's focus on promoting diversity and inclusion across all areas of the music industry.

=== Board members ===
As of May 2023, Music Biz's current Board of Directors includes:

- Tony Alexander, Made in Memphis Entertainment
- Sydney Alston Brown, Apple Music
- Caryl Atwood, Sony Music Entertainment
- Kristen Bender, Universal Music Group
- Tobago Benito, F.A.M.S Coalition
- Brittany Benton, Brittany's Record Shop
- Tracy Chan, SoundCloud
- Erin Choi, Hopeless Records
- Marcus Cobb, Mozaic
- Nina Collins, WMX
- Monica Damashek, Spotify
- Alyssa Garcia, Meta
- Ken Glaser, Alliance Entertainment
- Justin Johnson, Darkside Records
- Allison Jones, Big Machine Label Group
- Sean McMullan, Amazon Music
- Gina Miller, MNRK Music Group; Nashville Music Equality
- Emilio Morales, Rimas Music
- Lisa Robinson, Downtown Music Holdings
- Theda Sandiford, Def Jam
- Corey Sheridan, TikTok
- Jason Taylor, Redeye
- Shelly Westerhausen, Secretly Distribution
- George White, SiriusXM + Pandora

An Advisory Committee and Junior Board have also been formed in recent years. Members attend and participate in Board meetings but do not have voting privileges. Rolling listings of Music Biz's governing boards are kept on the Association's website.

== Annual Music Biz Conference ==
Music Biz's marquee event is its Annual Music Biz Conference, which has taken place in Nashville, Tennessee since 2015. Year after year, the event features a robust educational program addressing the highest profile issues affecting the music business, and serves as a forum for private business meetings and networking opportunities. The Association held the Music Biz 2022 conference, its first in-person since the start of the COVID-19 pandemic, from May 9–12, 2022 at the JW Marriott Nashville. The 2022 conference was the most successful modern conference in the Association's history, with more than 2,300 industry professionals hailing from more than 750 companies in attendance across the event's four days.

== The Bizzy Awards ==
During the Annual Music Biz Conference, the Association also hosts its annual awards dinner and ceremony. The awards program saw a major revamp in 2022 when it was first held as the Bizzy Awards, shifting from awards focused on artistic and economic achievement and towards a philanthropy-focused format with crowd-sourced nominations. Association members.

Categories for the Bizzy Awards include:

- Leading Light Award — For a company or executive that has supported their staff via internal initiatives aimed at improving mental health and wellbeing and work/life balance.
- Agent of Change Award — For a company that exemplifies a commitment to diversity, equity and inclusion in their hiring practices, executive development, and promotion structure.
- #NEXTGEN_NOW One To Watch Award — For an executive under 40 whose work (professional and/or volunteer) has been exceptional, innovative, and stands out as a contribution to the industry.
- Master of Metadata Award — For a company or executive who has made a significant impact in the area of data processing, credit clarification, streamlining or otherwise promoting clean data and best practices.
- Frontline Innovator — For a retail store who showed exceptional inventiveness and ingenuity in their practices during the past year in their interactions with consumers.
- Marketing Superstar — For a marketing campaign that was innovative and thought provoking. Candidates can be from any sector of the industry, and campaigns can be physical or virtual.

In addition, Music Biz continues to present its Presidential Award for Outstanding Executive Achievement, one of the awards from the original format of the ceremony, during its annual dinner. In 2022, the Presidential Award was given to Julie Swidler, EVP of Business Affairs and General Counsel for Sony Music Entertainment "...in recognition of her accomplished industry leadership and many contributions to the success of the music business over the course of her career."
