= SAT1 =

SAT1 may refer to:

- Sat.1, a German television station
- SAT1 (gene) (spermidine/spermine N1-acetyltransferase 1), a human gene
