= Chilblain lupus erythematosus =

- Other names: Chilblain lupus erythematosus of Hutchinson, Chilblain lupus, CHLE, Hutchinson lupus.
- Specialty: Dermatology

Chilblain lupus erythematosus was initially described by Hutchinson in 1888 as an uncommon manifestation of chronic cutaneous lupus erythematosus. Chilblain lupus erythematosus is characterized by a rash that primarily affects acral surfaces that are frequently exposed to cold temperatures, such as the toes, fingers, ears, and nose. The rash is defined by oedematous skin, nodules, and tender plaques with a purple discoloration.

Its pathogenetic factors include cold-induced vascular thrombosis, blood stasis, and impaired microcirculation. Chilblain lupus has been linked to anti-Ro antibodies.

== Signs and symptoms ==
Lesions typically start during cold or wet weather and don't go away entirely. Generally, they are found on the backs of the hands and fingers, with some patients having more of them on the auricular finger. The feet can be affected as well. Foot lesions often result in necrosis developing more quickly if they are on the soles. Lesions on the trunk are rare, as are involvement of the ears and nose.

Lesions typically begin as pruritic and papuloerythematous, then become painful. There may occasionally be tiny ulcerations, fissural hyperkeratosis, and purplish infiltrates that resemble plaque.

In certain instances, CHLE lesions coincide with Raynaud's syndrome. It's not always necessary to have typical chilblains, especially in warm climates.

== Causes ==
The majority of chilblain lupus erythematosus cases are sporadic, with an autoimmune underlying pathophysiology; however, rare familial cases that are inherited autosomally dominantly have also been reported. The etiology of sporadic chilblain lupus erythematosus is believed to be vasoconstriction or microvascular injury brought on by cold.

== Mechanism ==
A missense mutation in TREX1, encoding the 3′–5′ repair exonuclease 1, was found in affected individuals of one kindred in familial CHLE with autosomal dominant inheritance. The killer lymphocytic protease granzyme A causes apoptotic ss-DNA damage, which is mediated in part by the TREX1 gene product. Granzyme A-mediated cell death was substantially less effective in heterozygous lymphoblast cells with the p.D18N mutation in TREX1, indicating a potential new function for this caspase-independent type of apoptosis in the pathophysiology of familial CHLE. It has been discovered that TREX1 mutations are linked to Sjögren's syndrome and SLE.

== Diagnosis ==
The Mayo Clinic has developed a set of diagnostic standards based on a limited number of chilblain lupus erythematosus patients. This comprises the following two major criteria: systemic lupus erythematosus/discoid lupus erythematosus or response to anti lupus erythematosus therapy or negative cryoglobulin/cold agglutinin studies; additionally, there must be acral skin lesions associated with cold temperature and evidence of lupus erythematosus in skin lesions on histopathology and/or direct immunofluorescence.

== Treatment ==
In order to stop recurrences, the first line of defense is to shield acral sites from cold and low temperatures. To avoid secondary infections, necrotic lesions must be treated as soon as possible with topical or systemic antibiotics. Up to half of patients have been demonstrated to benefit from topical steroids, especially when used in conjunction with a brief course of systemic steroids. Tacrolimus ointment and pimecrolimus cream, two topical calcineurin inhibitors, may also be useful in avoiding skin atrophy, one of the local side effects of long-term topical steroids. Because calcium channel blockers like nifedipine work against vasoconstriction, they lessen erythema and pain. Giving up smoking might be taken into consideration as a way to maximize the therapeutic benefits.

== Epidemiology ==
Only about 70 CHLE patients have been documented to as of 2008, including two families with an autosomal dominant-inherited form known as familial CHLE. While familial CHLE typically first appears in early childhood, sporadic CHLE typically affects middle-aged females.

In about 18% of cases, CHLE progresses to SLE and is accompanied by discoid lupus erythematosus lesions or other types of cutaneous lupus erythematosus. In patients who also have concurrent cutaneous lupus erythematosus, this percentage is even higher. In a study involving seventeen patients, discoid lupus erythematosus developed one to fourteen years after the onset of CHLE.

== See also ==
- Lupus erythematosus
- List of cutaneous conditions
