= Keratosis follicularis =

Keratosis follicularis may refer to:

- Darier's disease
- Focal palmoplantar keratoderma with oral mucosal hyperkeratosis

See also:

- Isolated dyskeratosis follicularis
- Keratosis follicularis spinulosa decalvans
