= Julie Swidler =

American attorney and music industry executive

- Born: Julie Greifer; New York, New York
- Education: Union College; Cardozo School of Law
- Occupations: Attorney and creative advisor
- Years active: 1982-present
- Employer(s): Launchpad Advisors, LLC (founder and key advisor)
- Board member of: Union College (Chair, Board of Trustees); RIAA (executive committee); TJ Martell Foundation (executive committee)
- Spouse(s): Michael Swidler (m, 1988)
- Children: 3
- Awards: UJA 2026 Music Visionary of the Year; Presidential award, Music Biz Association; ELI Award, Grammy Foundation; Billboard Women in Music (2006–2025); Billboard Power 100 (2014–2026)

Julie Greifer Swidler is an American attorney and creative advisor. She is the key advisor and founder of Launchpad Advisors, LLC, and the chair of the Union College board of trustees. From 2008- 2026, she served as executive vice president, business affairs, and general counsel (global) of Sony Music, where she advised Sony labels and operating units worldwide on all legal issues and policy initiatives, and oversaw artist contracts, litigation, corporate transactions, joint venture operations, and global government affairs.

Swidler has appeared on the Billboard list of the most powerful women in the music industry for 19 years and on the magazine's "Power 100" every year since 2014. She has received awards including the UJA 2026 Music Visionary of the Year Award, the Grammy Foundation ELI Award, and the Presidential Award from the Music Biz Association.

== Early life and education ==
Swidler was born and raised in Long Island. Her father, Ira Greifer, was a pediatric nephrologist and her mother, Carol, was a social worker. She became a music fan as a young child, listening to records that included a UK pressing of the Beatles album Rubber Soul that her father brought home from an overseas business trip.

She attended Union College, where she was a DJ at WRUC, the school's radio station. Her playlists were eclectic; she played music from artists that ranged from Hot Tuna to Bruce Springsteen, Chuck Mangione, and The Supremes. She promoted shows and booked live music at the campus coffeehouse and sang in a duo.

Swidler was also a member of the Speaker's Forum and the College Conduct committee. In her senior year she received a meritorious service award for “service to the College above and beyond the call of duty.”

Swidler graduated from Union with a degree in political science in 1979. She considered singing professionally but instead decided to study law. She attended Benjamin N. Cardozo School of Law and earned her JD in 1982. She was a member of the Cardozo Law Review.

== Career ==
=== 1988-1999: PolyGram, Mercury Records ===
After working at several law firms, and as an in-house attorney at advertising agency J. Walter Thompson, Swidler began her career in the music industry as a senior attorney at PolyGram Records. She was promoted to assistant general counsel in 1990, and vice president, assistant general counsel in 1992. In addition to working with artists including Bon Jovi, Def Leppard and John Mellencamp, she was the lead counsel for Woodstock '94, the three-day festival that commemorated the 25th anniversary of Woodstock. She negotiated and drafted joint ventures and sponsorship deals for the festival and created the contracts required for video, film, recording and documentary rights for Bob Dylan, Metallica, Aerosmith, Sheryl Crow. A sponsorship deal with Pepsi and other revenue-generating strategies that were controversial at the time were later considered a significant factor in the evolution of the modern music festival model.

In 1995 she was named senior vice president business and legal affairs at Polygram's Mercury Records division. Ed Eckstine, then the president of Mercury, was one of her mentors.

=== 2000- 2008: J Records, RCA, and BMG ===
In 1999, Swidler made a lateral move to Arista Records, where she reported to Clive Davis, Arista's founder and CEO. In 2000, Arista celebrated its 25th anniversary with an NBC special that aired internationally on broadcast television and web platforms; Swidler negotiated all of the artist, production, broadcasting and webcasting contracts.

Swidler was one of five Arista executives Davis brought with him to J Records, the label he launched following his departure from Arista in 2000. A 50/50 joint venture with BMG, it was quickly successful, releasing multi-platinum records by Alicia Keys, Rod Stewart, and Luther Vandross, among others, during its first 18 months. J's initial recording sessions were charged to her credit card. In 2002, J was fully acquired by BMG and merged with RCA Records to create the RCA Music Group. Swidler served as its senior vice president until 2004, when she was named executive vice president business and legal affairs at BMG in 2008. She worked closely with Davis at BMG, and appeared in his autobiography (and the documentary) Clive Davis: The Soundtrack of Our Lives.

Swidler first appeared on Billboard's annual list of the 20 most powerful women in the music industry in 2006. She was 12th on the list in 2007. and eighth in 2008.

=== 2008-present: Sony Music Entertainment, Launchpad Advisors ===
In 2008, Swidler was appointed executive VP, business affairs and general counsel for Sony Music Entertainment. Also appointed to the company's executive committee, she reported to then-CEO Rolf Schmidt-Holtz. She subsequently reported to and worked closely with former Sony Music CEO Doug Morris and his successor, Rob Stringer.

In 2014 she oversaw the 50% acquisition of Ultra Records and the launch of Judy McGrath's Astronauts Wanted: No Experience Necessary. She ran Sony Nashville for several months as the label searched for a new CEO in 2016; in addition to Kenny Chesney and Carrie Underwood, she worked with Tyler Farr, whose album Suffer in Peace was the first Sony Nashville release to hit the Billboard Top 10 in eighteen months. She worked closely with Zara Larsson, who in 2017 name-checked her alongside Sylvia Rhone on song "Make That Money Girl." ("Get up on the throne, Queen, that's where you belong...Floor to the ceilin', Stack money, stack millions, Oh, what a feelin', Julie Swidler, run a buildin' everyday.") In 2020, after Pharrell Williams called attention to the offensiveness of the word "master"—which refers to the recording used to reproduce music—Swidler worked with Stringer to remove it from Sony contracts. Sony was the first label to do so.

She was one of the leaders of Sony's Artists Forward initiative, introduced in 2021. In addition to other artist services, Artists Forward pays royalties to artists signed before 2000 without regard to their recoupment status, an initiative that echoed the company's earlier distribution of $250 million in Spotify shares to recouped and unrecouped artists.

She played a central role in negotiating the music industry's terms for digital distribution as streaming became dominant, and negotiated streaming and licensing deals with platforms including SoundCloud, Spotify, YouTube, Apple Music, and Vevo. She led Sony Music's public policy and global governmental affairs initiatives, which included addressing issues related to copyright and lobbying for legislative action to protect musicians from generative AI clones and soundalikes.

Swidler stepped down from her position at Sony Music in June 2026. She founded Launchpad Advisors, LLC , an advisory services company focused on creative ventures, in July 2026.

== Advocacy, affiliations, and community service ==
In 2016 Swidler received the Grammy Foundation Entertainment Law Initiative Service Award, which recognizes attorneys who have advanced and supported the music community through legal service. In accepting the award, which was presented by Davis, she quoted Joni Mitchell's "Free Man in Paris." ("I deal with dreamers, and telephone screamers.") She was the first woman and first label executives to receive the award.

She was one of the six female music executives to sign a letter to the NARAS board of trustees following the 2018 Grammy Awards, during which only one female solo artist won in a televised category. In response to a reporter's question about the lack of female reprerentation, NARAS CEO Neil Portnow stated: "Women who want to be musicians, who want to be engineers, producers, and want to be part of the industry on the executive level” needed to “step up." The women who wrote the letter -- "the most powerful women in the music industry"—described NARAS as "woefully out of touch with today’s music, the music business, and even more significantly, society" and stated that Portnow's comments were “emblematic of a much larger issue with the NARAS organisation as a whole on the broader set of inclusion issues across all demographics." Portnow resigned in May 2018. It was reported that Swidler was on a short list of candidates to replace him.

Swidler is a founding member of the NARAS task force on diversity and inclusion, which examines barriers and biases affecting women and other underrepresented voices in the music industry. She is a member of the NY State Bar Association task force on preserving diversity in the wake of the US Supreme Court ruling on affirmative action, and on the board of directors for the TJ Martell Foundation and the Recording Industry Association of America. She spoke at the United States Copyright Office as part of a "Powering change: Women in Innovation and Creativity" panel.

Swidler joined the Union College board of trustees in 2015 and was named chair in 2023. In a statement following her appointment, she said: “Higher education is expected to face many challenges over the next decade, from a demographic cliff to financial headwinds," and stated that her priority was to support the Union community as the challenges were faced and come up with solutions "to move from strength to strength for our long-term sustainability.”

== Personal life ==
Swidler and her husband, Michael, were married in 1988. They have three children. Among other causes, they support Rwanda’s Agahozo-Shalom Youth Village, a residential community home to those orphaned during and after the 1994 Rwandan genocide. They live in New York City.

== Selected awards and recognition ==
Year(s)	Award	Presenting organization	Notes
2026	Music Visionary of the Year	UJA	Annual award for exceptional professional accomplishments and commitment to philanthropy in the music industry
2006-2025	Women in Music	Billboard	Annual list of the most powerful women in the music industry
2014-2026	Power 100	Billboard	Annual list of the 100 most powerful people in the music industry
2020-2025	Power of Law/Legal Elite	Variety	Annual list of the most powerful lawyers in the entertainment industry
2023	Hall of Fame	Billboard	For cumulative appearances on the Billboard Power 100 and Women in Music
2020	Presidential award	Music Biz Association	In recognition of outstanding executive achievement
2017	Lifetime Achievement Award	TJ Martell Foundation	For achievement in the music industry
2016	ELI Service award	Grammy Foundation	First woman and first label executive to receive the award, which recognizes significant legal support for artists
2016	Legal Champion of the Arts	Volunteer Lawyers for the Arts	In recognition of her service to artists.
