= Warty dyskeratoma =

Benign tumour

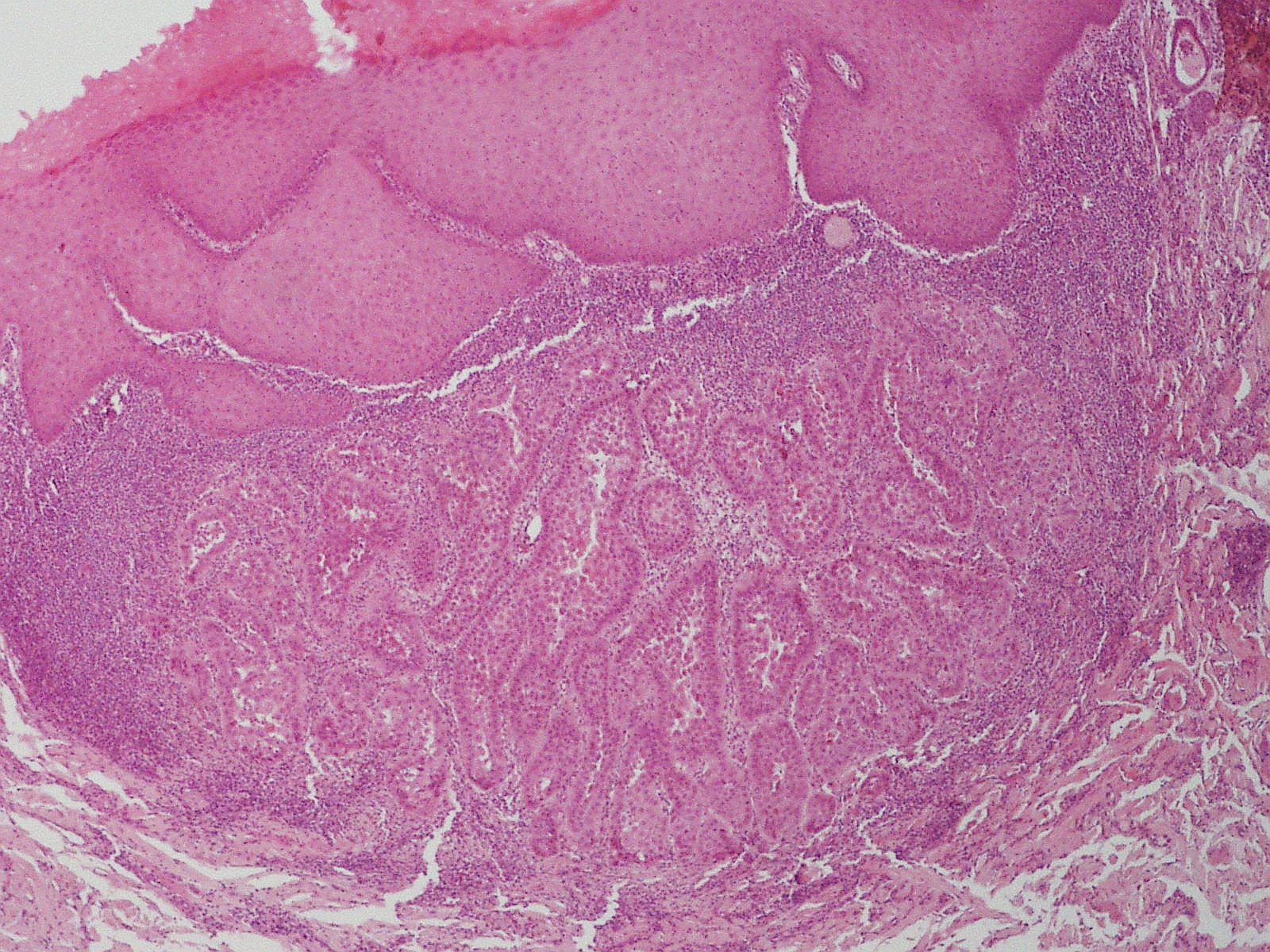
Warty dyskeratoma

Warty dyskeratoma, also known as an Isolated dyskeratosis follicularis, is a benign epidermal proliferation with distinctive histologic findings that may mimic invasive squamous cell carcinoma and commonly manifests as an umbilicated (Having a central mark or depression resembling a navel) lesion with a keratotic plug, WD have some histopathologic similarities to viral warts but it's not caused by HPV and the majority of these lesions display overall histopathologic features consistent with a follicular adnexal neoplasm. Usually limited to the head, neck, scalp or face and vulva. Lesions are generally solitary and sporadic and may be associated with a follicular unit. Oral involvement, particularly the hard palate, and genital involvement have been reported. it can also be thought of as one of the manifestations of focal acantholytic dyskeratosis, an epidermal reaction pattern that can be seen in several disorders, including Darier's disease and Grover's disease. But the main Difference between Darier disease and Warty dyskeratoma, is that Darier disease inherited dermatosis (autosomal dominant) consisting of multiple keratotic papules on the face, trunk, and extremities, while WD occurs as an isolated, noninherited, single keratotic nodule mainly confined to the head and neck as mentioned earlier.

== Differential Diagnosis ==
Warty dyskeratoma must be differentiated from vulvar dysplasia, Bowenoid papulosis, squamous carcinoma, condyloma, and other viral-induced squamous lesions.

== See also ==
- Keratosis follicularis (disambiguation)
- Stucco keratosis
- List of cutaneous conditions
