= Keratosis follicularis spinulosa decalvans =

- Other names: Siemens-1 syndrome
- Specialty: Medical genetics

Keratosis follicularis spinulosa decalvans is a rare X-linked disorder described by Siemens in 1926. It is a disease that begins in infancy with keratosis pilaris localized on the face, then evolves to more diffuse involvement.

An association with SAT1 has been suggested.

== See also ==
- Keratosis follicularis
- Hermann Werner Siemens
- Cicatricial alopecia
- List of cutaneous conditions
