= IFI6 =

Protein-coding gene in humans

Identifiers
- Aliases: IFI6, 6-16, FAM14C, G1P3, IFI-6-16, IFI616, interferon alpha inducible protein 6
- External IDs: OMIM: 147572; GeneCards: IFI6

Gene location (Human)
Chr.	Chromosome 1 (human)
Band	1p35.3	Start	27,666,064 bp
Band	1p35.3	End	27,672,212 bp
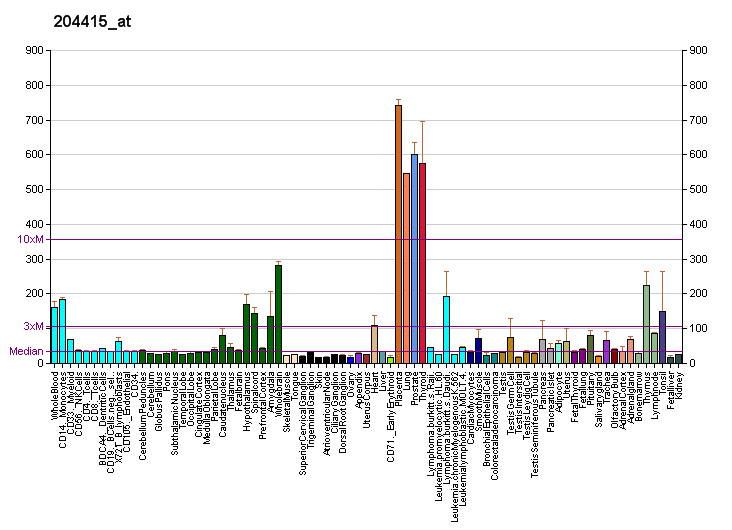
RNA expression pattern
Bgee	Human / Mouse (ortholog); Top expressed in: anterior pituitary; Descending thoracic aorta; right lung; monocyte; right adrenal gland; right adrenal cortex; right coronary artery; periodontal fiber; right uterine tube; granulocyte / n/a; More reference expression data
BioGPS	More reference expression data
Gene ontology
Molecular function	protein binding
Cellular component	integral component of membrane; plasma membrane; membrane; mitochondrion
Biological process	negative regulation of mitochondrial depolarization; negative regulation of cysteine-type endopeptidase activity involved in apoptotic process; negative regulation of extrinsic apoptotic signaling pathway in absence of ligand; type I interferon signaling pathway; immune response; release of cytochrome c from mitochondria
Sources:Amigo / QuickGO
Orthologs
Databases	NCBI: entry; OMA: entry
Species	Human	Mouse
Entrez	2537	n/a
Ensembl	ENSG00000126709	n/a
UniProt	P09912	n/a
RefSeq (mRNA)	NM_022873; NM_002038; NM_022872	n/a
RefSeq (protein)	NP_002029; NP_075010; NP_075011	n/a
Location (UCSC)	Chr 1: 27.67 – 27.67 Mb	n/a
PubMed search		n/a
- Wikidata
View/Edit Human

Interferon alpha-inducible protein 6 is a protein that in humans is encoded by the IFI6 gene.

This gene was first identified as one of the many genes induced by interferon. The encoded protein may play a critical role in the regulation of apoptosis. A mini-satellite that consists of 26 repeats of a 12 nucleotide repeating element resembling the mammalian splice donor consensus sequence begins near the end of the second exon. Alternatively spliced transcript variants that encode different isoforms by using the two downstream repeat units as splice donor sites have been described.

An antiviral function has been attributed to IFI6 against several members of theFlaviviridae family (DENV, YFV, ZIKV, WNV). IFI6 was able to interfere with the virus replication by preventing the formation of virus-induced membrane structures that represent a replication organelle.
