= Complement 3 deficiency =

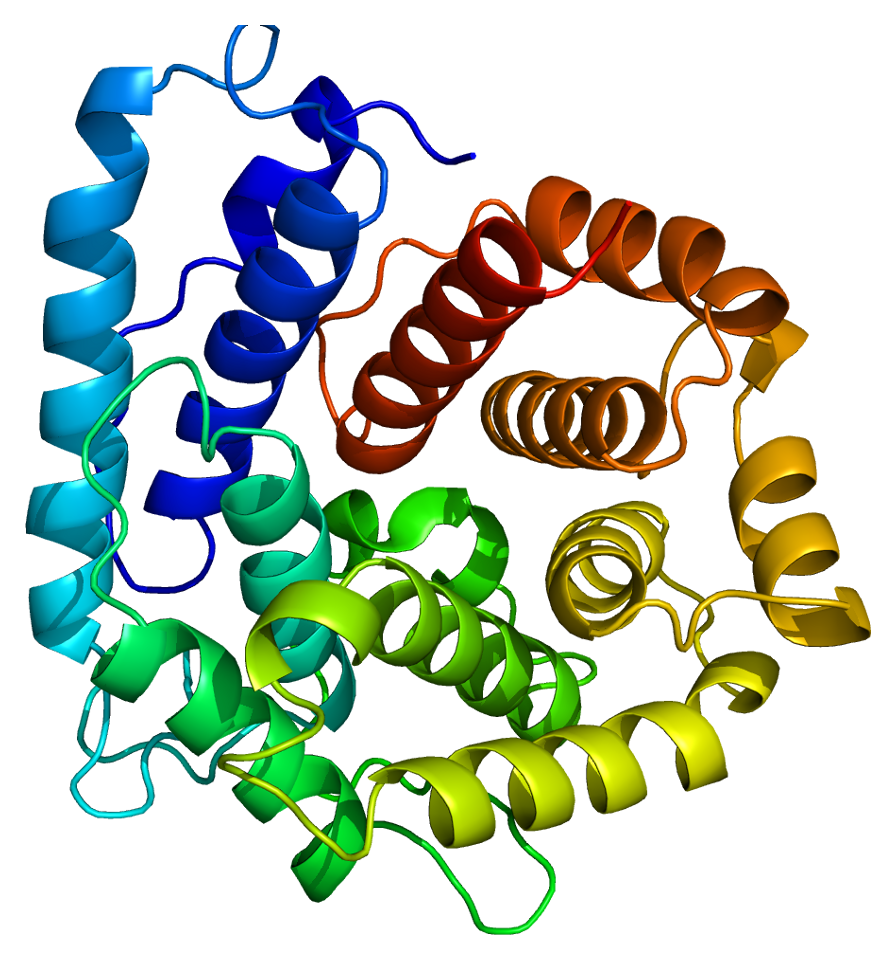
- Structure of the C3 protein. Based on PyMOL rendering of PDB 1c3d
- Specialty: Immunology

Complement 3 deficiency is a genetic condition affecting complement component 3 (C3). People can suffer from either primary or secondary C3 deficiency. Primary C3 deficiency refers to an inherited autosomal-recessive disorder that involves mutations in the gene for C3. Secondary C3 deficiency results from a lack of factor I or factor H, two proteins that are key for the regulation of C3. Both primary and secondary C3 deficiency are characterized by low levels or absence of C3.

== C3 function ==
Complement component 3 (C3) is a protein involved in both the innate and adaptive immune response. C3 is one of over 30 complement proteins circulating in the blood. C3 circulates in an inactive form but can be activated in order to aid the immune system's response to a foreign invader. C3 is the most abundant complement component and is a particularly important complement component because there are three ways to activate the complement system, but C3 plays a central role in all three of these pathways (see the pages for the classical pathway, alternative pathway, and the lectin pathway). Each of these pathways involves the formation of a C3-convertase, which will cleave C3 molecules into C3a and C3b fragments. This is important because an unregulated C3-convertase will cause a deficiency of intact C3 molecules by generating these fragments.

The human gene for C3 is located on chromosome 19. In a healthy individual, C3 is secreted by hepatocytes (liver cells) as well as monocytes and macrophages, dendritic cells, polymorphonuclear leukocytes, fibroblasts, and endothelial cells. These cells will increase production of C3 in response to cytokine signaling (from IL-1, IL-6, TNF-alpha, or interferon gamma) or in response to the presence of lipopolysaccharide, which is expressed in the outer membrane of gram-negative bacteria.

== Cases of complement 3 deficiency ==
As of 2016, primary C3 deficiency had been reported in 37 individuals (from 29 families) around the world. Patients with primary or secondary C3 deficiency generally displayed symptoms (i.e. suffered from infection) within the first 2 years of life.

In addition to studying C3 deficiency in diagnosed human patients, researchers have studied C3 deficiency in animals. C3 deficiency can be induced by injecting animals with cobra venom factor, which functions like an unregulated C3-convertase because factor I and factor H do not regulate it, cleaving most C3 molecules in the serum into C3a and C3b fragments, which depletes the amount of intact C3.

== Clinical implications ==
C3 deficiency makes an individual susceptible to severe, recurrent infections from encapsulated bacteria. These infections are more often caused by gram-negative bacteria (such as Neisseria meningitidis, Haemophilus influenzae, Klebsiella aerogenes, and Escherichia coli), but can also be caused by gram-positive bacteria (such as Streptococcus pneumoniae, Streptococcus pyogenes, Staphylococcus aureus, and Streptococcus milleri). Infections of the respiratory tract, such as pneumonia, have commonly been observed in C3 deficient patients.

In some cases, primary and secondary C3 deficiency have been associated with the onset of rheumatic or renal (kidney) diseases, such as systemic lupus erythematosus and membranoproliferative glomerulonephritis. (Note that some studies have grouped rheumatic and renal diseases under the broader category of immune complex-mediated diseases.) There have been recorded cases of C3 deficient patients that suffer only from immune complex-mediated diseases and not severe, recurrent infections.

Treatment for C3 deficiency has generally involved the prescription of regular antibiotics intended to prevent infection.
