= Rheumatoid lung disease =

Human disease

- Other names: Rheumatoid lung
- Specialty: Rheumatology

Rheumatoid lung disease is a disease of the lung associated with RA, rheumatoid arthritis. Rheumatoid lung disease is characterized by pleural effusion, pulmonary fibrosis, lung nodules and pulmonary hypertension. Common symptoms associated with the disease include shortness of breath, cough, chest pain and fever. It is estimated that about one quarter of people with rheumatoid arthritis develop this disease, which are more likely to develop among elderly men with a history of smoking.

Rheumatoid lung is separate from but often associated with Interstitial lung disease(ILD).

== Signs and symptoms ==
Most common:

- Chest Pain
- Cough
- Fever
- Shortness of breath
- Joint pain, stiffness, swelling
- Skin nodules

People may not present with all these symptoms or none at all.

From most to least common:

- Pleural involvement (pleurisy, effusions)
- Pulmonary parenchymal nodules, more common in men than in women
- Rheumatoid-associated interstitial lung disease
- Bronchiolitis obliterans organizing pneumonia
- Obliterative bronchiolitis (obstructive lung disease/bronchiectasis)
- Rheumatoid-associated pulmonary hypertension
- Pulmonary vasculitis/arteritis
- Shrinking lung syndrome
- Miscellaneous: MTX, cricoarytenoid arthritis, infection, cancer

== Causes ==
The exact cause of rheumatoid lung disease is unknown. However, associated factors could be due largely to smoking. Sometimes, the medicines used to treat rheumatoid arthritis, especially methotrexate, may result in lung disease.

Prevention:

- Stop smoking: Chemicals found in cigarettes can irritate already delicate lung tissue, leading to further complications.
- Having regular checkups: The doctor could listen to lungs and monitor breathing, because lung problems that are detected early can be easier to treat.

== Mechanism ==
RA is a complex and poorly understood disease.

However, the characteristic presence of antibodies to citrullinated proteins (anti-CCP) suggests that there are pathogenic mechanisms unique to RA. Recent studies suggest a link between smoking, HLA-DRBSE, anti-CCP and RA. Smoking has long been linked to RA and worsens articular disease as well as rheumatoid lung disease. Exposure to cigarette smoke leads to the activation of PADI enzymes that deaminate arginine to citrulline, producing autoantigens like citrullinated collagen and fibrinogen. Autoantigenic peptides containing citrulline residues are preferentially bound by HLA-DRB SE proteins and are presented to T cells, which interact with CCP-specific B cells found at sites containing autoantigen and produce inflammatory cytokines and autoantibodies, which accelerate disease. Bacterial or viral infections of the respiratory tract may also exacerbate pulmonary inflammation and rheumatoid lung disease.

== Diagnosis ==
The diagnosis of RA was formerly based on detection of rheumatoid factor (RF). However, RF is also associated with other autoimmune diseases. The detection of anti-CCP is currently considered the most specific marker of RA. The diagnosis of rheumatoid lung disease is based on evaluation of pulmonary function, radiology, serology and lung biopsy. High resolution CT scans are preferred to chest X-rays due to their sensitivity and specificity.

Associated doctors to diagnosis this properly would be a Rheumatologists or Pulmonologist.

Within a physical examination doctors could find possible indications, such as hearing crackles (rales) when listening to the lungs with a stethoscope. Or, there may be decreased breath sounds, wheezing, a rubbing sound, or normal breath sounds. When listening to the heart, there may be abnormal heart sounds. Bronchoscopic, video-assisted, or open lung biopsy allows the histological characterization of pulmonary lesions, which can distinguish rheumatoid lung disease from other interstitial lung diseases.

The following tests may also show signs of rheumatoid lung disease:

- Chest x-ray may show:
  - pleural effusion
  - lower zone predominant reticular or reticulonodular pattern
  - volume loss in advanced disease
  - skeletal changes, e.g. erosion of clavicles, glenohumeral erosive arthropathy, superior rib notching
- Chest CT or HRCT features include:
  - pleural thickening or effusion
  - interstitial fibrosis
  - bronchiectasis
  - bronchiolitis obliterans
  - large rheumatoid nodules
    - single or multiple
    - tend to be based peripherally
    - may cavitate (necrobiotic lung nodules)
    - cavitation of a peripheral nodule can lead to pneumothorax or haemopneumothorax.
  - follicular bronchiolitis
    - small centrilobular nodules or tree-in-bud
    - rare
  - Caplan syndrome
- Echocardiogram (may show pulmonary hypertension)
- Lung biopsy (bronchoscopic, video-assisted, or open), which may show pulmonary lesions
- Lung function tests
- Needle inserted into the fluid around the lung (thoracentesis)
- Blood tests for rheumatoid arthritis

== Treatment ==
Many people with this condition have no symptoms. Treatment is aimed at the health problems causing the lung problem and the complications caused by the disorder.

Fast-acting drugs for RA include aspirin and corticosteroids, which alleviate pain and reduce inflammation. Slow-acting drugs termed disease modifying antirheumatic drugs (DMARDs), include gold, methotrexate and hydroxychloroquine (Plaquenil), which promote disease remission and prevent progressive joint destruction. In patients with less severe RA, pain relievers, anti-inflammatory drugs and physical rest are sufficient to improve quality of life. In patients with joint deformity, surgery is the only alternative for recovering articular function.

Prognosis is related to the underlying disorder and the type and severity of lung disease. In severe cases, lung transplantation can be considered. This is more common in cases of bronchiolitis obliterans, pulmonary fibrosis, or pulmonary hypertension. Most complications are not fatal, but does reduce life expectancy to an estimated 5 to 10 years.

== Epidemiology ==
The prevalence of RA is around 0.3–1.2% (0.92% of Americans). Women are 2–3 times more susceptible than men. The prevalence of rheumatoid lung disease in patients with RA depends on the method used for diagnosis: chest X rays (5%), high resolution CT scans (10–40%).

A study showed 582 patients with RA and 603 subjects without RA were followed for a mean of 16.4 and 19.3 years, respectively. The lifetime risk of developing ILD was 7.7% for RA patients and 0.9% for subjects without RA. The risk of developing ILD was higher in patients with older age at RA onset, among male patients and for individuals with parameters that indicate more severe RA.

Survival of RA patients diagnosed with ILD was worse compared to RA patients without ILD. ILD contributed approximately 13% to the excess mortality of patients with RA patients when compared to the general population.

== History ==
Rheumatoid Lung was first described in 1948.

1948, they published several cases of patients with RA who had severe erosive joint disease who also developed an interstitial lung and suggested there may be an association between the inflammatory joint disease and interstitial lung disease.

1953, Anthony Caplan described rheumatoid nodules within the lung parenchyma, associated with pneumoconiosis in coal miners, who were exposed to coal dust.

1954, rheumatoid lung nodules were found in patients with RA who were not exposed to coal dust and without pneumoconiosis.

1955 there was a short case series of about 10 patients with RA whose autopsies showed that the pleural disease was much higher in rheumatoid patients than in the general population, and much higher than what they had previously seen clinically.

1961, Cudkowicz described the first pulmonary function tests and lung biopsies were done in RA patients.

== Research ==
According to a recent study, the main risk factors for RA-ILD are advancing age, male sex, greater RA disease activity, rheumatoid factor (RF) positivity, and elevated titers of anticitrullinated protein antibodies such as anticyclic citrullinated peptide. Cigarette smoking also appears to increase risk of RA-ILD, especially in patients with human leukocyte antigen DRB1.

A recently published retrospective study by a team from Beijing Chao-Yang Hospital in Beijing, China, supported three of the risk factors listed for RA-ILD and identified an additional risk factor. In that study of 550 RA patients, logistic regression analysis of data collected on the 237 (43%) with ILD revealed that age, smoking, RF positivity, and elevated lactate dehydrogenase closely correlated with ILD.Recent studies have identified risk factors for disease progression and mortality. A retrospective study of 167 patients with RA-ILD determined that the usual interstitial pneumonia (UIP) pattern on high-resolution computed tomography (HRCT) was a risk factor for progression, as were severe disease upon diagnosis and rate of change in pulmonary function test results in the first 6 months after diagnosis.

A study of 59 RA-ILD patients found no median survival difference between those with the UIP pattern and those without it. But the UIP group had more deaths, hospital admissions, need for supplemental oxygen, and decline in lung function.
