= Childhood-onset nephrotic syndrome =

Kidney disorder

Childhood-onset nephrotic syndrome is a kidney disorder characterized by severe proteinuria (excess proteins in the urine), hypoalbuminemia (low albumin levels in the blood), and edema (swelling) that affects approximately 2–7 per 100,000 children under 18 years of age annually. It is classified based on response to steroid therapy as steroid-sensitive (SSNS), steroid-dependent (SDNS), or steroid-resistant (SRNS). While most cases are idiopathic (apparently random with no known cause), genetic causes account for up to 30% of childhood cases, particularly in very young patients. The most common histopathology observation (microscopic examination of a kidney biopsy) is minimal change disease, though focal segmental glomerulosclerosis (kidney scaring) is increasingly seen. Management of the syndrome typically involves corticosteroids as first-line therapy, with more than 80% of children initially responding. However, relapses are common, and steroid-resistant cases may progress to end-stage renal disease requiring transplantation. Complications like thromboembolism (blood clots) can occur, with higher risks in congenital (observed in new born) and steroid-resistant forms.

Childhood-onset nephrotic syndrome differs from the adult nephrotic syndrome in that the former often has a single common cause that typically responds well to steroid treatment. In adults, there are numerous potential causes, which makes an early kidney biopsy necessary to determine the correct diagnosis and treatment plan. It also differs from the nephrotic syndrome that often develops in young individuals with childhood-onset systemic lupus erythematosus, i.e., cSLE. cSLE is a form of systemic lupus erythematosus that develops in children up to 18 years of age. It frequently involves lupus nephritis and secondary to that the nephrotic syndrome due to severe kidney disease (see treatment of cSLE-related lupus nephritis).
