= Minimal mesangial glomerulonephritis =

- Specialty: Nephrology

Minimal mesangial glomerulonephritis is a type of glomerulonephritis that is seen in 10% to 25% of SLE cases and is associated with mild clinical symptoms. Immune complexes deposit in the mesangium, with a slight increase in the mesangial matrix and cellularity.
