= SAT1 (gene) =

Protein-coding gene in the species Homo sapiens

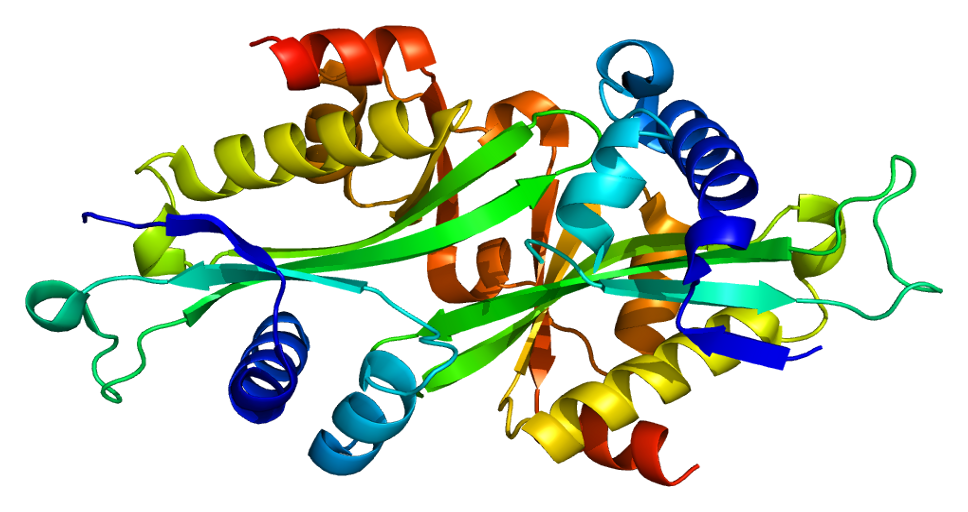

Identifiers
- Aliases: SAT1, DC21, KFSD, KFSDX, SAT, SSAT, SSAT-1, spermidine/spermine N1-acetyltransferase 1
- External IDs: OMIM: 313020; MGI: 98233; GeneCards: SAT1
Available structures
PDB	Ortholog search: PDBe RCSB
PDB	List of PDB id codes 2B3U, 2B3V, 2B4B, 2B4D, 2B58, 2B5G, 2F5I, 2FXF, 2G3T, 2JEV
Enzyme activity
EC #	BRENDA	ExPASy	KEGG	MetaCyc
2.3.1.57	↗	↗	↗	↗

Gene location (Mouse)
Chr.	X chromosome (mouse)
Band	X F3|X 72.38 cM	Start	153,996,128 bp
Band	X F3|X 72.38 cM	End	153,999,445 bp
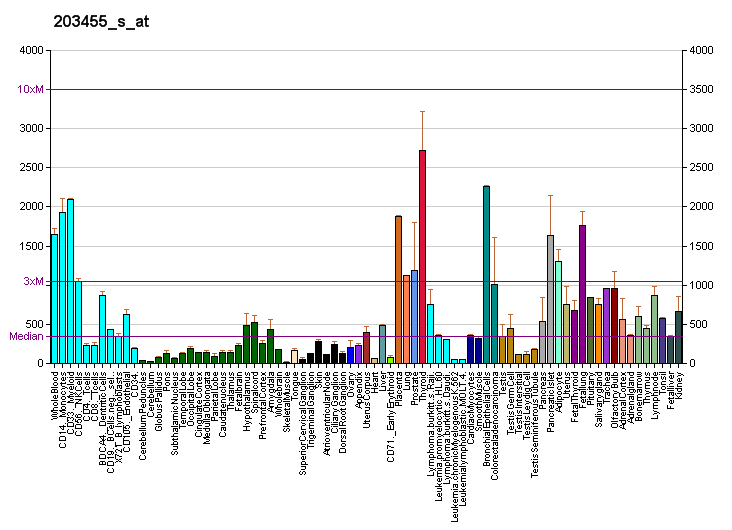

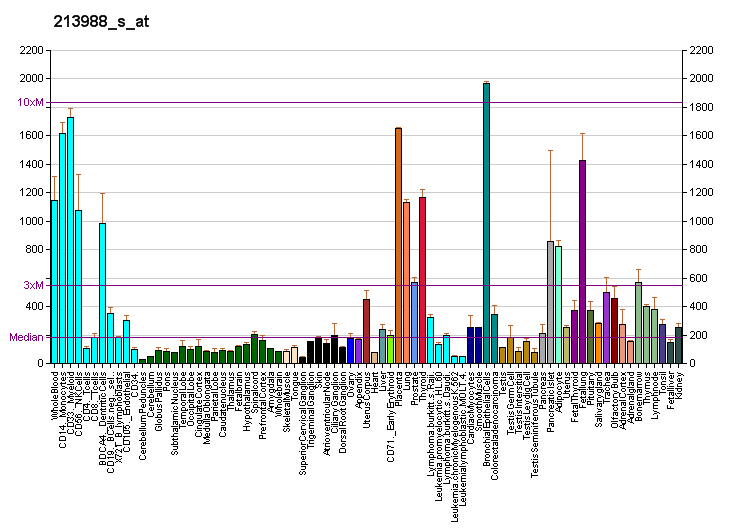

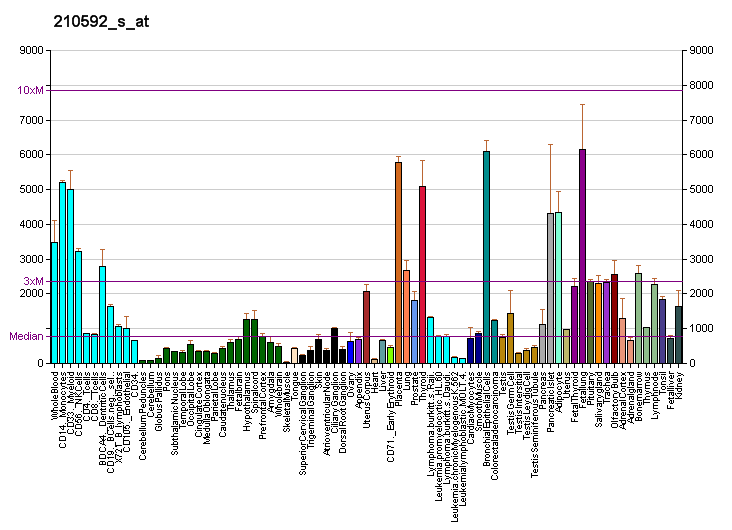
RNA expression pattern
Bgee	Human / Mouse (ortholog); Top expressed in: monocyte; palpebral conjunctiva; amniotic fluid; right lung; upper lobe of left lung; trachea; anterior pituitary; endothelial cell; bronchus; gallbladder / Top expressed in: granulocyte; morula; proximal tubule; right kidney; blastocyst; human kidney; spleen; ileum; islet of Langerhans; lung; More reference expression data
BioGPS	More reference expression data
Gene ontology
Molecular function	transferase activity; N-acetyltransferase activity; acyltransferase activity; protein binding; spermidine binding; diamine N-acetyltransferase activity; identical protein binding
Cellular component	cytoplasm; intracellular anatomical structure; cytosol
Biological process	polyamine biosynthetic process; regulation of cell population proliferation; angiogenesis; putrescine catabolic process; polyamine catabolic process; polyamine metabolic process; spermidine acetylation; spermine catabolic process
Sources:Amigo / QuickGO
Orthologs
Databases	NCBI: entry
Species	Human	Mouse
Entrez	6303	20229
Ensembl	n/a	ENSMUSG00000025283
UniProt	P21673	P48026
RefSeq (mRNA)	NM_002970	NM_001291865; NM_009121
RefSeq (protein)	NP_002961	NP_001278794; NP_033147
Location (UCSC)	n/a	Chr X: 154 – 154 Mb
PubMed search
- Wikidata
View/Edit Human	View/Edit Mouse

Diamine acetyltransferase 1 (also termed spermidine/spermine N(1)-acetyltransferase 1, SSAT, and SAT1) is an enzyme that in humans is encoded by the SAT1 gene found on the X chromosome.

== Gene ==
The SAT1 gene is 3,069 base pairs long.

In 1992 at The Johns Hopkins University School of Medicine, Lei Xiao and several others cloned over 4000 base pairs of the region containing the coding sequence of the SAT1 gene also referred to as SSAT-1, SSAT, SAT, KFSD, DC21, KFSDX gene. This gene is located on the X chromosome in the region Xp22.1. The primer extension analysis indicated that the transcription started 179 bases upstream from the translational start site. Furthermore, they determined that it appeared to be controlled by a "TATA-less" promoter. Normally, there would be a TATA box where RNA polymerase II would be involved in assisting with initiation by properly positioning the enzyme, however in a TATA-less promoter situation the TATA box is absent.

== Structure ==
The encoded diamine acetyltransferase 1 contains 171 amino acids and its molecular mass is 20024 Da (daltons).

== Function ==
Spermidine/spermine N(1)-acetyltransferase (SPD/SPM acetyltransferase) is a rate-limiting enzyme in the catabolic pathway of polyamine metabolism. It catalyzes the N(1)-acetylation of spermidine and spermine and, by the successive activity of polyamine oxidase, spermine can be converted to spermidine and spermidine to putrescine. The SAT1 gene is used to help regulate polyamine levels inside the cell by regulating their transport in and out of the cell. SAT1 is also involved in the first step to synthesize N-acetylputrescine from putrescine. PMF1 and NRF2 work together to transcript the SAT1 gene.

The SAT1 gene plays a vital role in the catabolic pathway of polyamine metabolism. It acts as a rate-limiting enzyme in the pathway of polyamine metabolism, meaning it is significant in the involvement of cell survival. Research has shown that the tumor protein known as p53 can specifically target the SAT1 gene that results in ferroptotic cell-death. Ferroptosis is when a death of a cell is caused by an iron-dependent accumulation of a lipid.

== Clinical significance ==
=== Keratosis follicularis spinulosa decalvans ===
An association with keratosis follicularis spinulosa decalvans (KFSD) has been suggested. Data shows that keratosis follicularis spinulosa decalvans could be caused by mutations in the SAT 1 gene. KSFD is also believed to be X-linked, which helps prove that the disease is caused by a mutation found in the SAT 1 gene which is located on the X chromosome. The mutation most likely occurs at the location Xp22.1. KDSF mostly affects men, which makes sense for it to be an X-linked disease, caused by a mutation of the SAT1 gene.

=== Neu–Laxova syndrome ===
The SAT1 gene has implications with NLS-2 Neu–Laxova syndrome, type 2 (NLS). It is inherited as an autosomal recessive trait and is considered a rare lethal congenital disorder. Severe growth delays before birth including low birth weight and shorter than normal length occur. After birth, outward observable characteristics include significant small skull size (microcephaly), wider than normal spaced eyes, sloped forehead and other disfiguring facial features. There may also be random places of fluid retention (edema) throughout the body and permanent joint limitations due to limb malformations. NLS can be detected in pregnant woman with ultrasound examination. In some people of Neu-Laxova syndrome, other areas were severely affected such as skin, genitals, and other internal organs including the heart. Males and females are equally affected and could be most closely associated with persons of Pakistani origin. However, there have been cases reported in several other diverse backgrounds. The prognosis is extremely poor and in most cases the infant dies shortly after birth or are stillborn. The first documented and reported case in Japan involved a baby girl exhibiting microcephaly, severe edema, and other symptoms. In her case she had a condition known as congenital vertical talus or rocker-feet. The foot is abnormally shaped in a convex position. She survived 134 days.

=== Suicide ===
Elevated levels of RNA transcripts of SAT1 in the bloodstream have been associated with a higher risk of suicide.
