= TREX1 =

Protein-coding gene in the species Homo sapiens

Identifiers
- Aliases: TREX1, AGS1, CRV, DRN3, HERNS, three prime repair exonuclease 1, RVCLS
- External IDs: OMIM: 606609; MGI: 1328317; GeneCards: TREX1
Available structures
PDB	Ortholog search: PDBe RCSB
PDB	List of PDB id codes 2IOC, 2O4G, 2O4I, 2OA8, 3B6O, 3B6P, 3MXI, 3MXJ, 3MXM, 3U3Y, 3U6F, 4YNQ
Enzyme activity
EC #	BRENDA	ExPASy	KEGG	MetaCyc
3.1.11.2	↗	↗	↗	↗

Gene location (Human)
Chr.	Chromosome 3 (human)
Band	3p21.31	Start	48,465,811 bp
Band	3p21.31	End	48,467,645 bp

Gene location (Mouse)
Chr.	Chromosome 9 (mouse)
Band	9|9 F2	Start	108,887,001 bp
Band	9|9 F2	End	108,888,802 bp
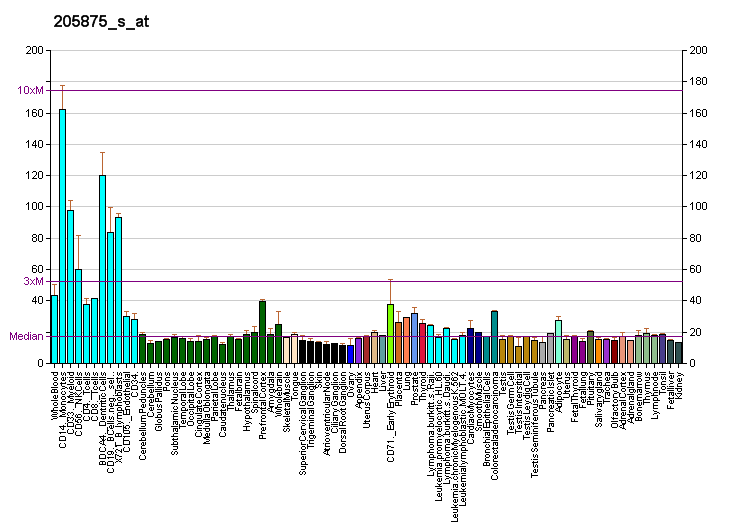

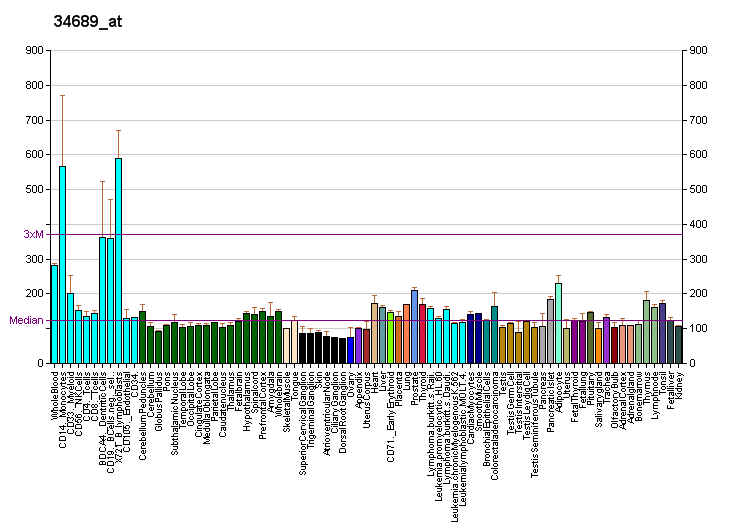
RNA expression pattern
Bgee	Human / Mouse (ortholog); Top expressed in: olfactory zone of nasal mucosa; granulocyte; monocyte; spleen; skin of abdomen; skin of leg; anterior pituitary; blood; salivary gland; minor salivary glands / Top expressed in: lens; spleen; urinary bladder; quadriceps femoris muscle; adrenal gland; bone marrow; granulocyte; muscle tissue; muscle of thigh; white adipose tissue; More reference expression data
BioGPS	More reference expression data
Gene ontology
Molecular function	protein homodimerization activity; metal ion binding; single-stranded DNA binding; exodeoxyribonuclease III activity; MutSalpha complex binding; protein binding; 3'-5'-exodeoxyribonuclease activity; MutLalpha complex binding; nucleic acid binding; nuclease activity; exonuclease activity; hydrolase activity; 3'-5' exonuclease activity; double-stranded DNA binding; adenyl deoxyribonucleotide binding; magnesium ion binding; DNA binding; DNA binding, bending; WW domain binding
Cellular component	cytoplasm; nuclear envelope; endoplasmic reticulum membrane; membrane; endoplasmic reticulum; nucleus; cytosol; oligosaccharyltransferase complex; protein-DNA complex; nuclear replication fork
Biological process	DNA recombination; regulation of type I interferon production; DNA replication; DNA mismatch repair; nucleic acid phosphodiester bond hydrolysis; DNA metabolic process; DNA repair; cellular response to interferon-beta; blood vessel development; kidney development; adaptive immune response; organ or tissue specific immune response; activation of immune response; macrophage activation involved in immune response; lymphoid progenitor cell differentiation; immune response in brain or nervous system; inflammatory response to antigenic stimulus; T cell antigen processing and presentation; regulation of immunoglobulin production; heart morphogenesis; heart process; atrial cardiac muscle tissue development; generation of precursor metabolites and energy; regulation of glycolytic process; DNA modification; DNA catabolic process; inflammatory response; immune response; cellular response to DNA damage stimulus; determination of adult lifespan; response to UV; regulation of gene expression; regulation of fatty acid metabolic process; regulation of cellular metabolic process; transposition, RNA-mediated; DNA duplex unwinding; interferon-alpha production; regulation of tumor necrosis factor production; cellular response to oxidative stress; cellular response to reactive oxygen species; cellular response to UV; CD86 biosynthetic process; apoptotic cell clearance; regulation of cellular respiration; innate immune response; regulation of innate immune response; establishment of protein localization; regulation of lipid biosynthetic process; regulation of inflammatory response; regulation of catalytic activity; protein stabilization; regulation of T cell activation; defense response to virus; type I interferon signaling pathway; negative regulation of type I interferon-mediated signaling pathway; regulation of protein complex stability; cellular response to organic substance; cellular response to type I interferon; cellular response to gamma radiation; cellular response to hydroxyurea; immune complex formation; DNA synthesis involved in UV-damage excision repair; regulation of lysosome organization
Sources:Amigo / QuickGO
Orthologs
Databases	NCBI: entry; OMA: entry
Species	Human	Mouse
Entrez	11277	22040
Ensembl	ENSG00000213689	ENSMUSG00000049734
UniProt	Q9NSU2	Q91XB0
RefSeq (mRNA)	NM_033629; NM_007248; NM_016381; NM_033627; NM_033628	NM_001012236; NM_011637
RefSeq (protein)	NP_009179; NP_338599	NP_001012236; NP_035767
Location (UCSC)	Chr 3: 48.47 – 48.47 Mb	Chr 9: 108.89 – 108.89 Mb
PubMed search
- Wikidata
View/Edit Human	View/Edit Mouse

Three prime repair exonuclease 1 is an enzyme that in humans is encoded by the TREX1 gene.

== Function ==
This gene encodes the major 3'->5' DNA exonuclease in human cells. The protein is a non-processive exonuclease that may serve a proofreading function for a human DNA polymerase. It is also a component of the SET complex, and acts to rapidly degrade 3' ends of nicked DNA during granzyme A-mediated cell death. Mutations in this gene result in Aicardi-Goutieres syndrome, chilblain lupus, RVCL (Retinal Vasculopathy with Cerebral Leukodystrophy), and Cree encephalitis. Multiple transcript variants encoding different isoforms have been found for this gene.

== Clinical relevance ==
Mutations within the TREX1 gene cause familial chilblain lupus. The TREX1 polymorphisms confer susceptibility to systemic lupus erythematosus. Missense mutations of the TREX1 gene significantly downregulate its exonucleolytic capacity and result in the accumulation of nucleic acids. The build-up of the nucleic acids within the cytoplasm stimulates type-I interferon responses that could trigger autoimmune responses. The region containing the TREX1 gene (3p21.31) has been linked to COVID-19 severity in a recent genome-wide association study. This might explain the occurrence of chilblain like lesions in patients infected with SARS-CoV-2.

TREX1 helps HIV‑1 to evade cytosolic sensing by degrading viral cDNA in the cytoplasm

Mutations in TREX1 can give cause failure to appropriately remove ribonucleotides misincorporated into DNA. The removal process is ordinary performed by ribonucleotide excision repair. In humans, a defect in this process can give rise to Aicardi-Goutieres syndrome involving microcephaly and neuroinflammation.

== Homology directed DNA repair ==
TREX1 is the most abundant 3’-5’ DNA exonuclease in mammals. Dominant C-terminal TREX1 genetic variants can disrupt homology-directed DNA repair and thus can trigger DNA damage and premature senescence phenotypes in humans, mice and Drosophila. Such TREX1 variants can also cause adult onset small vessel disease known as vasculopathy with cerebral leukoencephalopathy.
