= Acute cutaneous lupus erythematosus =

- Specialty: Dermatology

Acute cutaneous lupus erythematosus is a cutaneous condition characterized by a bilateral malar rash (also known as a "butterfly rash") and lesions that tend to be transient, and that follow sun exposure. The acute form is distinct from chronic and subacute cutaneous lupus erythematosus, which may have different types of skin lesions. Cutaneous lupus erythematosus is associated with both lupus erythematosus-specific lesions and cutaneous manifestations that are not specific to lupus erythematosus, such as oral ulcers and urticaria. Because of the diagnostic criteria used to diagnose systemic lupus erythematosus, a patient with only cutaneous manifestations may be diagnosed with the systemic form of the disease.

== Forms ==
Acute cutaneous lupus erythematosus can be either localized or generalized.

=== Localized form ===
The localized form of the disease is most commonly associated with the malar rash and normally develops in a patient's twenties. The localized form occurs only above the patient's neck and is not associated with rashes in other parts of the body.

=== Generalized form ===
Generalized acute cutaneous lupus erythematosus includes skin below the patient's neck and is described as a macropapular rash or photosensitive lupus dermatitis. Symptoms include similar erythematic lesions as seen in the localized form, but forms a symmetrical rash and can be mistaken for a drug rash.

== See also ==
- Lupus erythematosus
- List of cutaneous conditions
