= Verrucous =

Verrucous (appearing like a wart or "verruca") can refer to:

- Verrucous carcinoma
- Verrucous lupus erythematosus
- Proliferative verrucous leukoplakia
- Verrucous perforating collagenoma
- Verrucous cyst
- Verrucous vascular malformation
- Unilateral palmoplantar verrucous nevus
