= Lupus erythematosus panniculitis =

- Other names: Lupus erythematosus profundus, Lupus panniculitis, "Lupus profundus", and Subcutaneous lupus erythematosus
- Specialty: Dermatology

Lupus erythematosus panniculitis presents with subcutaneous nodules that are commonly firm, sharply defined and nontender.

== Signs and symptoms ==
Lupus erythematosus panniculitis consists of soft, deep subcutaneous plaques or nodules that can occasionally appear in crops. Proximal extremities, in particular the lateral aspects of the arms and shoulders, face, trunk, buttocks, breast, and scalp, are typically involved. Lesions can affect several areas at once or just one. Very few generalized forms exist. There is a preference for the face in pediatric patients. In cases of discoid lupus erythematosus, the skin surface may exhibit scaling, atrophy, follicular plugging, telangiectasias, depigmentation, or ulceration. Erythema is a common clinical feature in the overlying skin. The clinical course of lupus erythematosus panniculitis lesions is chronic and relapsing. There are areas of lipoatrophic depression left behind after the nodules resolve.

== Causes ==
Lupus erythematosus panniculitis may manifest independently or in conjunction with discoid lupus erythematosus (DLE) or systemic lupus erythematosus (SLE). Lupus erythematosus panniculitis occurs independently twice as often as when combined with SLE or DLE.

== Diagnosis ==
The gold standard for diagnosing a lesioned skin specimen is its histopathological examination. Two authors have outlines a histopathologic diagnostic criteria for lupus erythematosus panniculitis. The major criteria includes calcification, periseptal or lobular lymphocytic panniculitis, lymphocytic aggregates and lymphoid follicle formation, and hyaline fat necrosis. The minor criteria includes discoid lupus erythematosus alterations in the skin layer above, lymphocytic vascular inflammation, subepidermal zone hyalinization, mucin deposition, histiocytes and tiny granulomas, and plasma cell and eosinophil infiltrates.

Although serologic analyses are frequently normal, it is occasionally possible to show a positive antinuclear antibody titer. Antibodies against double-stranded DNA are less common. The serology for syphilis may give a false positive. Anemia, lowered C4 levels, positive rheumatoid factor, lymphopenia, and anemia are additional potential abnormalities in the laboratory.

== Outlook ==
Despite being regarded as a benign form of lupus erythematosus, lupus erythematosus panniculitis can occasionally cause significant morbidity due to the disease's damaging cosmetic effects and disability caused by painful lesions.

== Treatment ==
Antimalarials are regarded as the traditional course of care and, for certain patients, their first option. Diltiazem in combination can be beneficial for patients with calcified nodules. Topical corticosteroids, primarily clobetasol propionate, may be added occasionally.

Thalidomide is regarded as the most effective treatment for lupus erythematosus panniculitis.

== Epidemiology ==
Lupus erythematosus panniculitis may impact both sexes, but women are more likely to experience it. The percentages of frequency in case series vary, with different reports having female-to-male ratios of 2:1, 3:1, 4:1, and 9:1.

Although the age at which the disease manifests itself varies as well, most patients are between 30 and 60 years old. The median age was 41 years old in a set of 40 cases, and 42 years old in another Spanish series. Asian patients appear to be affected by lupus erythematosus panniculitis at a slightly younger age group, with a mean age of 31. Cases involving children are uncommon. Rarely, neonatal lupus has been linked to lupus erythematosus panniculitis.

== See also ==
- Lupus erythematosus
- List of cutaneous conditions
