= Tumid lupus erythematosus =

- Other names: "Lupus erythematosus tumidus"
- Specialty: Dermatology

Tumid lupus erythematosus is a rare, but distinctive entity in which patients present with edematous erythematous plaque.

Lupus erythematosus tumidus (LET) was reported by Henri Gougerot and Burnier R. in 1930. It is a photosensitive skin disorder, a different subtype of cutaneous lupus erythematosus (CLE) from discoid lupus erythematosus (DLE) or subacute CLE (SCLE). LET is usually found on sun-exposed areas of the body. Skin lesions are edematous, urticarialike annular papules and plaques. Topical corticosteroids are not effective as treatment for LET, but many will respond to chloroquine. LET resolves with normal skin, no residual scarring, no hyperpigmentation or hypopigmentation. Cigarette smokers who have LET may not respond very well to chloroquine.

It has been suggested that it is equivalent to Jessner lymphocytic infiltrate of the skin.

== Signs and symptoms ==
The characteristic presentation of tumid lupus erythematosus is erythematous, edematous plaques that lack ulceration or scaling. In contrast to discoid lupus erythematosus (DLE), there is no atrophy, scarring, or follicular plugging. Skin exposed to the elements, such as the face, upper chest (V-neck distribution), upper back, extensor arms, and shoulders, is typically affected by tumid lupus erythematosus. Rare cases of tumid lupus erythematosus affecting the lower extremities have been documented, nevertheless. Tumid lupus erythematosus typically manifests itself in the summer in temperate climates.

Papules and plaques of tumid lupus erythematosus can create an annular pattern in certain patients, resembling annular subacute cutaneous lupus erythematosus (SCLE), with less edema at the center. A Blaschkoid distribution, scalp involvement resembling alopecia areata, and periorbital edema are less frequent signs of tumid lupus erythematosus.

== Causes ==
There is currently no known unique etiology for tumid lupus erythematosus. However, it has been shown that triggering variables like ultraviolet (UV) exposure can exacerbate tumid lupus erythematosus lesions. Its link to autoimmune disease has generated debate; an autoimmune workup may be started if an autoimmune disease is suspected. It is suggested that immune dysregulation results in T cell suppression. There has been evidence of a correlation between smoking and medications such as thiazide diuretics, monoclonal antibodies, angiotensin-converting enzyme inhibitors, tumor necrosis factor antagonists, and highly active antiretroviral therapy.

== Diagnosis ==
The identification of consistent clinical symptoms and histopathologic findings is the basis for the diagnosis of tumid lupus erythematosus. Provocative phototesting results and antimalarial medication response are additional tests that are not usually required but can confirm a diagnosis of tumid lupus erythematosus.

Proposed diagnostic criteria reflect key findings in tumid lupus erythematosus:

1. Clinical - Smooth-surfaced, succulent, urticarial-like, erythematous plaques in sun-exposed areas.
2. Histologic - There is no epidermal involvement or modification of the dermoepidermal interface; instead, there is perivascular and periadnexal lymphocytic infiltration, interstitial mucin deposition, and, in certain instances, dispersed neutrophils.
3. Phototesting - Skin lesion proliferation following exposure to ultraviolet A (UVA) and/or ultraviolet B (UVB) radiation.
4. Treatment - Quick and efficient systemic antimalarial medication treatment.

== Treatment ==
First-line treatments include photoprotection, topical calcineurin inhibitors, and intralesional and/or topical corticosteroids. Antimalarial medications like hydroxychloroquine or chloroquine should be used as part of a systemic treatment for patients who do not respond to conservative therapy or who have a severe illness. Methotrexate or mycophenolate mofetil along with folic acid supplements are examples of second-line therapy. If all previous treatments are ineffective, third-line treatments such as thalidomide or lenalidomide may be considered. Another effective treatment for suppressive, non-curative conditions is pulse dye laser. In order to keep the lesions from relapsing in these patients, trigger avoidance measures including wearing sunscreen and abstaining from smoking are essential.

== See also ==
- Lupus erythematosus
- List of cutaneous conditions
