= Neuropsychiatric systemic lupus erythematosus =

- Other names: CNS lupus, lupus cerebritis
- Specialty: Rheumatology, neurology, psychiatry

Neuropsychiatric systemic lupus erythematosus (NPSLE) refers to the neurological and psychiatric manifestations of systemic lupus erythematosus (SLE). SLE is an autoimmune disease that can affect many of the body's organs and systems. It is estimated that over half of people with SLE have neuropsychiatric involvement.

== Classification ==
The American College of Rheumatology (ACR) has outlined 19 syndromes that are seen in NPSLE. These syndromes encompass disorders of the central and peripheral nervous systems:

Central nervous system

- Aseptic meningitis
- Cerebrovascular disease
- Demyelinating syndrome
- Headache
- Movement disorder
- Myelopathy
- Seizure disorders
- Acute confusional state
- Anxiety disorder
- Cognitive dysfunction
- Mood disorder
- Psychosis

Peripheral nervous system

- Acute inflammatory demyelinating polyradiculoneuropathy
- Autonomic disorder
- Mononeuropathy (single/multiplex)
- Myasthenia gravis
- Cranial neuropathy
- Plexopathy
- Polyneuropathy

Each of the 19 syndromes are also stand-alone diagnoses that can occur with or without primary SLE.

The majority of cases involve the central nervous system (CNS), which consists of the brain and spinal cord. The most common CNS syndromes are headache and mood disorder.

Though neuropsychiatric lupus is sometimes referred to as "CNS lupus", it can also affect the peripheral nervous system (PNS). Between 10–15% of people with NPSLE have PNS involvement. Mononeuropathy and polyneuropathy are the most common PNS syndromes.

=== Other syndromes ===
Some neurological syndromes outside of the ACR classification may also be considered NPSLE manifestations. These include neuromyelitis optica, posterior reversible encephalopathy syndrome, small fiber neuropathy, and Lambert–Eaton myasthenic syndrome.

== Pathogenesis ==
There are several possible mechanisms that underlie the nervous system manifestations of lupus. Specific syndromes may be vasculopathic, autoantibody-mediated, or inflammatory in nature.

There is evidence that the blood–brain barrier, which protects the CNS, is compromised in patients with NPSLE. As a result, autoantibodies are able to infiltrate the CNS and cause damage.

== Diagnosis ==
For the diagnosis of NPSLE, it is crucial to ascertain whether neuropsychiatric symptoms are indeed a consequence of SLE itself, whether they constitute a distinct comorbid condition, or whether they are a side effect of disease SLE treatment. Furthermore, the onset of neuropsychiatric symptoms may precede the diagnosis of SLE. Due to the lack of uniform diagnostic standards, statistics about NPSLE vary widely. Diagnostic testing modalities that may aid in diagnosis include MRI, electrophysiological studies, psychiatric evaluation, and autoantibody tests.

== Treatment ==
Management of NPSLE is similar to the management of neuropsychiatric illness in patients without lupus. Treatment depends on the underlying causes of a patient’s symptoms, and may include immunosuppressants, anticoagulants, and symptomatic therapy.

== See also ==
- Lupus headache
