= Anti-histone antibodies =

Autoantibodies

Anti-histone antibodies are autoantibodies that are a subset of the anti-nuclear antibody family, which specifically target histone protein subunits or histone complexes. They were first reported by Henry Kunkel, H.R. Holman, and H.R.G. Dreicher in their studies of cellular causes of lupus erythematosus in 1959–60. Today, anti-histone antibodies are still used as a marker for systemic lupus erythematosus, but are also implicated in other autoimmune diseases like Sjögren syndrome, dermatomyositis, or rheumatoid arthritis. Anti-histone antibodies can be used as a marker for drug-induced lupus.

== Specificity ==
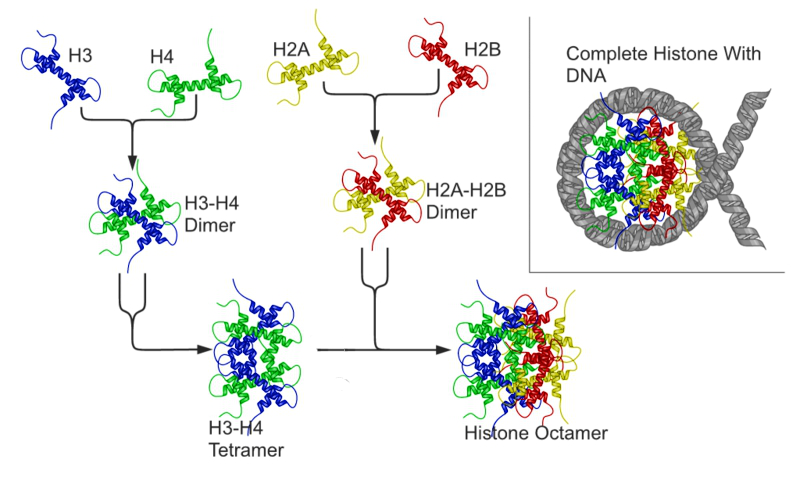
Histones are complexes of proteins, around which DNA is stored. Anti-histone antibodies may target the histone complex or any of the protein subunits shown here.

Anti-histone antibodies target five major classes of histone protein subunits: H1, H2A, H2B, H3, and H4. Anti-histone antibodies are diverse, so aside from targeting the protein subunits, different antibodies may also be specific for different complexes, including the H2A-H2B dimer or the H3-H4 tetramer. There is evidence that IgG and IgM anti-histone antibodies produced as a result of different drug exposures are specific to epitopes of different histone complexes. Highly modified histones have been shown to prompt a greater immune response.

== Detecting antibodies ==
Anti-histone antibodies can be clinically detected using an ELISA assay. A blood sample is required for the test.

Indirect immunofluorescence can also be used to detect anti-histone antibodies. Homogeneous, diffuse staining indicates the presence of anti-histone antibodies, chromatin, and some double-stranded DNA.

== Implications in disease ==
Ninety-six percent of patients with lupus induced by procainamide will have a positive test for anti-histone antibodies, and 100% of patients whose lupus was induced by penicillamine, isoniazid, or methyldopa will have a positive test for anti-histone antibodies. In 70% of patients with rheumatoid arthritis, Felty's syndrome, Sjogren's syndrome, systemic sclerosis, and primary biliary cirrhosis, anti-histone antibodies are present. Anti-histone antibodies may also be present in Alzheimer's disease and dementia patients.

A value of greater than 1.5 units relative to a control serum is considered a positive ELISA test for the anti-histone antibodies. Patients with drug-induced lupus erythematosus typically have positive tests for anti-histone antibodies but do not have indications for anti-dsDNA antibodies. Patients with idiopathic systemic lupus erythematosus have both types of autoantibodies present in their blood. Thus, this test can be useful in distinguishing these two illnesses.
