= LE cell =

Type of macrophage

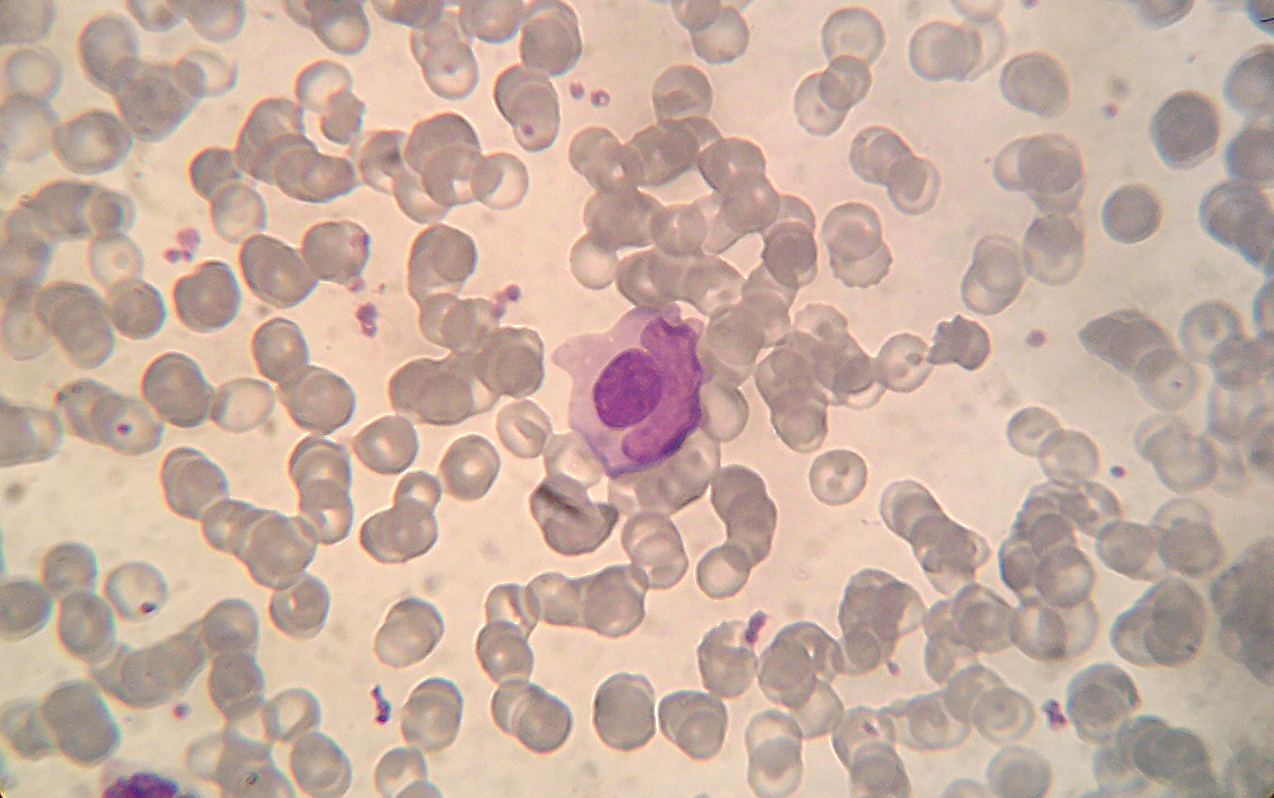
Microphotograph of a macrophage that has phagocytized a lymphocyte (LE cell). May Grünwald Giemsa stain.

A lupus erythematosus cell (LE cell), also known as Hargraves cell, is a neutrophil or macrophage that has phagocytosed (engulfed) the denatured nuclear material of another cell. The denatured material is an absorbed hematoxylin body (also called an LE body).

They are a characteristic of lupus erythematosus, but also found in similar connective tissue disorders or some autoimmune diseases like in severe rheumatoid arthritis. LE cells can be observed in drug-induced lupus, for example, following treatment with methyldopa.

The LE cell was discovered in bone marrow in 1948 by Malcolm McCallum Hargraves (1903–1982), a physician and practicing histologist at the Mayo Clinic. Hargraves may have gained priority by suppressing a publication draft of John R. Haserick, who credits Dorothy Sundberg, chief hematologist at the University of Minnesota Hospitals, with first identifying LE cells.

Classically, the LE cell is analyzed microscopically, but it is also possible to investigate this phenomenon by flow cytometry.

LE cells shouldn't be confused with Tart cells which have engulfed nuclear material, but with a visible chromatin rather than homogeneous appearance.
