= Anti-SSA/Ro autoantibodies =

Type of anti-nuclear autoantibodies

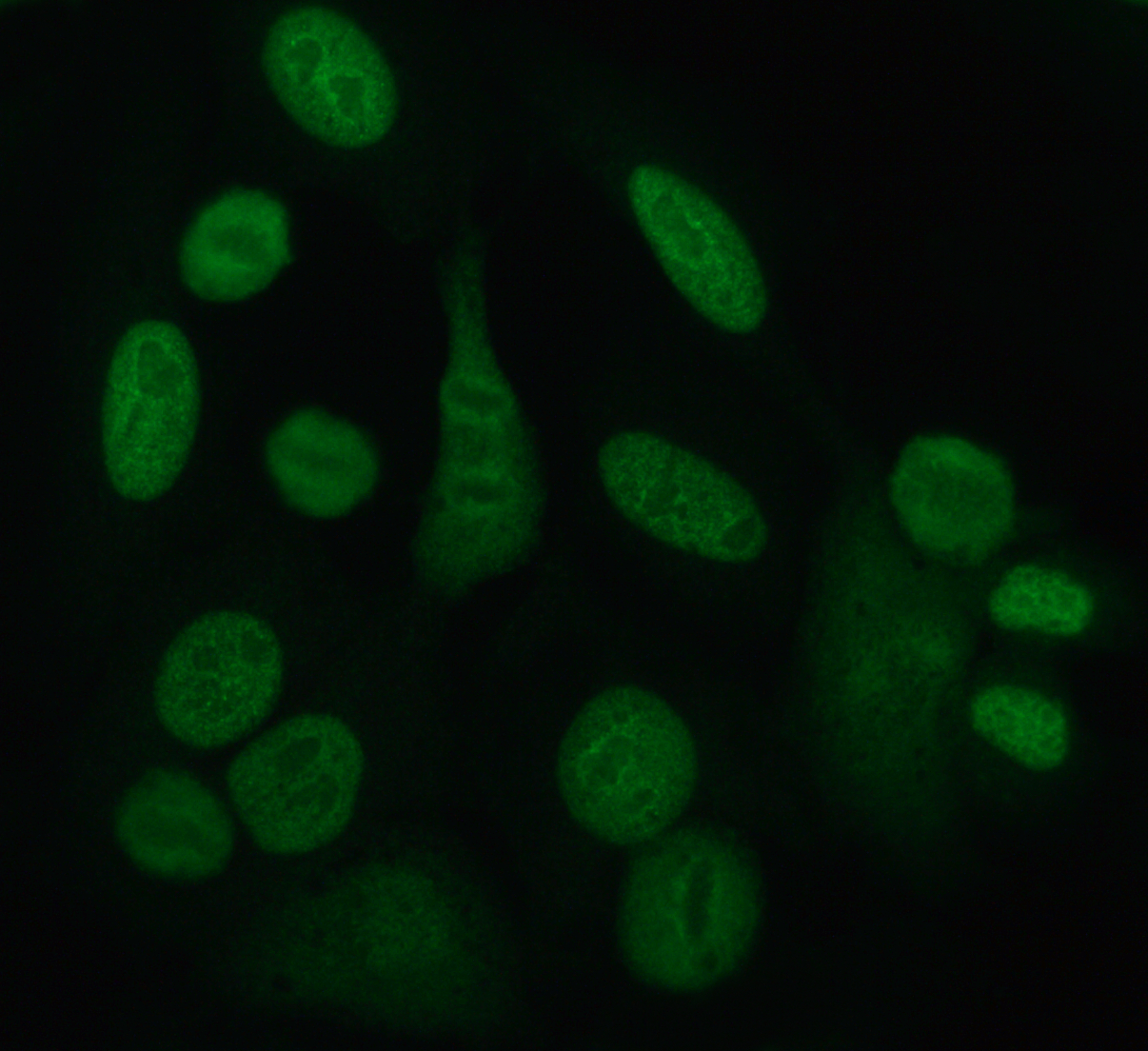
Immunofluorescence pattern of SS-A and SS-B antibodies. Produced using serum from a patient on HEp-20-10 cells with a FITC conjugate.

Anti-SSA autoantibodies (anti–Sjögren's-syndrome-related antigen A autoantibodies, also called anti-Ro, or similar names including anti-SSA/Ro, anti-Ro/SSA, anti–SS-A/Ro, and anti-Ro/SS-A) are a type of anti-nuclear autoantibodies that are associated with many autoimmune diseases, such as systemic lupus erythematosus (SLE), SS/SLE overlap syndrome, subacute cutaneous lupus erythematosus (SCLE), neonatal lupus and primary biliary cirrhosis. They are often present in Sjögren's disease (SS). Additionally, Anti-Ro/SSA can be found in other autoimmune diseases such as systemic sclerosis (SSc), polymyositis/dermatomyositis (PM/DM), rheumatoid arthritis (RA), and mixed connective tissue disease (MCTD), and are also associated with heart arrhythmia.

Anti-SSA/Ro autoantibodies are classified as extractable nuclear antigens. The Anti-SSA/Ro autoantibody targets Ro proteins, namely Ro52 and Ro60. Ro52 and Ro60 were originally thought to be one protein, however current findings show that they are two functionally distinct proteins encoded by genes on separate chromosomes. Anti-SSA/Ro autoantibodies are used in clinical settings as a diagnostic tool to identify patients with SLE and Sjögren's disease. In clinical tests for autoimmune disease, Anti-Ro antibodies are some of the most consistently and frequently detected among autoantibodies.

Anti-Ro autoantibodies are often found in conjunction with a similar antibody, Anti-La/SSB (also called anti–SS-B or anti–SS-B/La), in patients with SS. These two antibodies share pathological characteristics.

== History of discovery ==
In 1969, two separate labs simultaneously identified antigens in the sera of SLE and SS patients. Clark et al. referred to the antigen as Ro – named after the patient from which the antibodies were extracted, while Alspaugh & Tanand used the term SSA. It was later found that the labs described the same antigen, hence the compound term for the antibody, Anti-SSA/Ro, Anti-Ro/SSA.

== Methods of detection ==
In laboratory settings, ELISA and immunodiffusion assays are most commonly used to detect levels of Anti-Ro/SSA antibodies in patient sera.

Antibodies specific to Ro52 are difficult to detect via laboratory testing. Their low detectability may be attributed to several factors: the antibodies are precipitin negative, lack antinuclear antibody (ANA) specific fluorescence staining patterns, and have a low signature in ELISA assays. Furthermore, Ro52 can be masked by Anti-Ro60 antibodies in lab tests that simultaneously assess the two antibodies.

== Mechanism ==
Anti-Ro/SSA can target Ro52 and Ro60 proteins. Most Anti-Ro/SSA activity occurs on the cell surface, wherein Ro proteins are expressed on the cell membrane and extracellular Anti-Ro/SSAs bind to Ro. There is some evidence that the IgG isotype of anti-Ro/SSA antibody can enter the cell.

- Anti-Ro autoantibodies are typically IgA, IgM, and IgG isotypes, though most is known about the five IgG subclasses. The antibody is inducible via immunization using Ro peptide.

The mechanism that induces Anti-Ro/SSA production in autoimmune disorders remains under study. Some proposed factors that may stimulate production are viral infection, treatment of cells with TNF-α, cellular apoptosis, and exposure to UV irradiation.

- Anti-Ro/SSA is produced in the cytoplasm of cells in the epidermal layer of the skin following UV irradiation. Ro antigens are simultaneously upregulated on the cell surface, resulting in the Anti-Ro/SSA antibody marking cells for destruction. Anti-Ro52 antibodies in particular have been tied to elevated photosensitivity.

Certain alleles of the human major histocompatibility complex (MHC II, called HLA II in humans) have been associated with the presence of Anti-Ro antibodies and the spread of the immune response. Anti-Ro/SSA associates with the HLA II alleles HLA-DR3 and HLA-DR2, as well as some HLA-DQ alleles. The T-cell response plays a role in the formation of Anti-Ro/SSA antibodies due to T-cell affinity for MHC class II.

== Antigens ==
The specific pathogenic role of the Ro antigen in autoimmune disorders remains unknown.

=== Ro52 ===
The Ro52 gene is officially termed TRIM21, as it is a member of the tripartite motif (TRIM) protein family, qualified by its RING and B-box domains. The protein is typically located in the cytoplasm, though it can move to the nucleus in the presence of pro-inflammatory signals, and it can also be expressed on the cell surface. There is evidence that Ro52 itself is a cytosolic Fc receptor. Ro52 is a regulatory protein, and negatively moderates inflammatory response, such as the secretion of pro-inflammatory cytokines in the interleukin and INF families. Ro52 can both regulate and be induced by INF cytokines. Loss of function or blockage of Ro52 results in uncontrolled inflammation at the onset of injury or disease. Patients with systemic lupus erythamatosus and Sjögren's syndrome not only show elevated levels of Anti-Ro antibodies, but also elevated levels of Ro52.

Ro52 has one primary epitope to which anti-Ro/SSA binds, independent of the autoimmune disease. The most common domain anti-Ro52 targets is the coiled coil (cc) domain, as well as the RING and B-box domains.

Ro52 does not bind to small cytoplasmic non-coding RNA strands (hY-RNA). The notion that Ro52 formed a complex with Y RNA resulted from studies that suggesting that Ro52 and Ro60 formed a complex together.

Ro52 may impact the pathogenesis of autoimmune disease: patients with SLE and SS have been shown to express high levels of Ro52 transcripts. Although Ro52 and Ro60 are often jointly seen in elevated levels in patients with autoimmune disease, Ro52 manifests without Ro60 in Sjögren's. Additionally, Anti-Ro52 antibody has been identified at elevated levels in patients with interstitial lung disease, as well as in autoimmune hepatitis, type 1.

=== Ro60 ===
Ro60 is not part of the TRIM family. Ro60 is encoded by a gene 32 kb in length and acts to regulate the fate of misfolded RNA within the host cell. Ro60 forms a ribonucleoprotein complex with one molecule of noncoding Y1, Y3, Y4, or Y5RNA, all of which are approximately 100 nucleotides in length, to form the epitope that Anti-Ro60 recognizes. The absence of Ro60 results in an elevated immune response and decreased resilience to immune-related stress.

The epitope of the Ro60 protein is similar to that of the Epstein-Barr virus, and the presence of the virus may enhance the autoimmune response to Ro60, as anti-Epstein Barr antibodies can target the protein.

== In systemic lupus erythematosus (SLE) ==
Anti-Ro/SSA antibodies are found in 40–90% of patients with systematic lupus erythematosus (SLE). The antibodies can be detected years before symptoms of SLE surface, making them an effective diagnostic tool.

In patients with SLE, high levels of Anti-Ro/SSA are correlated with elevated levels of IFN-α. The presence of Anti-Ro/SSA antibodies also correlates with symptoms of photosensitivity, cutaneous vasculitis, and hematological disorders.

In individuals with cutaneous lupus erythematosus (CLE), a subcategory of lupus erythematosus, elevated levels of Ro52 are found regardless of expression of Anti-Ro autoantibodies.

== In neonatal lupus erythematosus (NLE) ==
The presence of Anti-SSA/Ro in pregnant women with SLE is associated with an increased risk of neonatal lupus erythematosus which can be accompanied by congenital heart block (CHB) in the fetus. SLE-related symptoms in infants that arise from Anti-Ro/SSA resolve in about six months as the mother's antibodies leave the baby's system. Mothers of babies with NLE most often do not show signs of autoimmune disease.

The role of Anti-SSA/Ro in NLE is remains under study, as recent studies have suggested that CHB in neonates is more generally linked to instances of autoimmunity in the mother rather than the presence of Anti-Ro/SSA antibody.
