= Hematoxylin body =

In diagnostic pathology, a hematoxylin body, or LE body, is a dense, homogeneous, basophilic particle, easily stainable with hematoxylin. It consists of degraded nuclear material from an injured cell, along with autoantibodies and a limited amount of cytoplasm.

Hematoxylin bodies occur in systemic lupus erythematosus. The hematoxylin body may be green, blue, or purple with the Papanicolaou stain and magenta with Romanowsky stains. The material has a positive Feulgen stain reaction, which is typical of DNA. The material may be extracellular or may be ingested by leukocytes, which are then known as LE cells.
