= Malar flush =

Red discolouration of the high cheeks

- Differential diagnosis: mitral stenosis, SLE

Malar flush is a plum-red discolouration of the high cheeks. It is classically associated with mitral valve stenosis due to the resulting CO_{2} retention and its vasodilatory effects. It can also be associated with lupus, polycythemia vera and homocystinuria.

== Definition ==
Malar flush is a plum-red discolouration of the high cheeks.

== Pathophysiology ==
Mitral valve stenosis may cause malar flush due to CO_{2} retention, which causes vasodilation of arterioles in the cheeks.

It can also be associated with other conditions, such as lupus, polycythemia vera and homocystinuria.

== See also ==
- Malar rash
