= Reactional keratosis =

- Specialty: Dermatology

Reactional keratosis is a premalignant keratotic skin lesion that may arise in a variety of long-standing, nonscarring, inflammatory processes such as cutaneous lupus erythematosus for example.
