= Drug-induced lupus erythematosus =

- Other names: DIL or DILE
- Hydralazine, a medication associated with drug-induced lupus erythematosus
- Specialty: Immunology, rheumatology

Drug-induced lupus erythematosus is an autoimmune disorder caused by chronic use of certain drugs. These drugs cause an autoimmune response (the body attacks its own cells) producing symptoms similar to those of systemic lupus erythematosus (SLE). There are 38 known medications to cause DIL but there are three that report the highest number of cases: hydralazine, procainamide, and quinidine. While the criteria for diagnosing DIL has not been thoroughly established, symptoms of DIL typically present as muscle pain and joint pain. Generally, the symptoms recede after discontinuing use of the drugs.

== Signs and symptoms ==
Signs and symptoms of drug-induced lupus erythematosus include the following:

- Joint pain (arthralgia) and muscle pain (myalgia)
- Fatigue
- Serositis—inflammation of the tissues lining the heart and lungs.
- Anti-histone antibodies in 95% of cases among those taking procainamide, hydralazine, chlorpromazine, and quinidine; however, these antibodies have been found in a smaller proportion of patients associated with other medications, including minocycline, propylthiouracil, and statins.

These signs and symptoms are not side effects of the drugs taken which occur during short term use. DIL occurs over long-term and chronic use of the medications listed below. While these symptoms are similar to those of systemic lupus erythematosus, they are generally not as severe unless they are ignored which leads to more harsh symptoms, and in some reported cases, death.

== Causes ==
The processes that lead to drug-induced lupus erythematosus are not entirely understood. The exact processes that occur are not known even after 50 years since its discovery, but many studies present theories on the mechanisms of DIL.

A predisposing factor to developing DIL is N-acetylation speed, or the rate at which the body can metabolize the drug. This is greatly decreased in patients with a genetic deficiency of the enzyme N-acetyltransferase. A study showed that 29 of 30 patients with DIL were slow acetylators. In addition, these patients had more hydralazine metabolites in their urine than fast acetylators. These metabolites (byproducts of the interactions between the drug and constituents in the body) of hydralazine are said to have been created when white blood cells have been activated, meaning they are stimulated to produce a respiratory burst. Respiratory burst in white blood cells induces an increased production of free radicals and oxidants such as hydrogen peroxide. These oxidants have been found to react with hydralazine to produce a reactive species that is able to bond to protein. Monocytes, one type of white blood cell, detect the antigen and relay the recognition to T helper cells, creating antinuclear antibodies leading to an immune response. Further studies on the interactions between oxidants and hydralazine are necessary to understand the processes involved in DIL.

Of the drugs that cause DIL, hydralazine has been found to cause a higher incidence. Hydralazine is a medication used to treat high blood pressure. Approximately 5% of the patients who have taken hydralazine over long periods of time and in high doses have shown DIL-like symptoms. Many of the other drugs have a low to very low risk to develop DIL. The following table shows the risk of development of DIL of some of these drugs on a high to very low scale.

- High risk:
  - Procainamide (antiarrhythmic)
  - Hydralazine (antihypertensive)
- Moderate risk:
  - Quinidine (antiarrhythmic)
- Low to Very Low Risk:
  - Infliximab anti (TNF-α)
  - Etanercept anti (TNF-α)
  - Isoniazid (antibiotic)
  - Minocycline (antibiotic)
  - Pyrazinamide (antibiotic)
  - D-Penicillamine (anti-inflammatory)
  - Carbamazepine (anticonvulsant)
  - Oxcarbazepine (anticonvulsant)
  - Phenytoin (anticonvulsant)
  - Propafenone (antiarrhythmic)
  - Chlorpromazine (antipsychotic)
  - Minoxidil (antihypertensive vasodilator)

== Diagnosis ==
Antinuclear antibodies are usually positive in drug-induced Lupus. Anti-Neutrophil Cytoplasmic antibodies (ANCA) can also be positive in association with certain drugs. Furthermore, anti-histone antibodies can also be positive in drug-induced lupus.

Anti-Histone antibodies are positive in up to 95% of patients with drug induced lupus. The most common medications associated with drug induced lupus are hydralazine, procainamide, isoniazid, methyldopa, chlorpromazine, quinidine, and minocycline.

== Treatment ==
It is important to recognize early that these drugs are causing DIL like symptoms and discontinue use of the drug. Symptoms of drug-induced lupus erythematosus generally disappear days to weeks after medication use is discontinued. Non-steroidal anti-inflammatory drugs (NSAIDs) will quicken the healing process. Corticosteroids may be used if more severe symptoms of DIL are present.

== See also ==
- Anti-histone antibody
- Lupus erythematosus
- Hydralazine
- Discoid lupus erythematosus
- List of cutaneous conditions
