= Neonatal lupus erythematosus =

- Specialty: Neonatology, Immunology

Neonatal lupus erythematosus is an autoimmune disease in an infant born to a mother with anti-Ro/SSA and with or without anti-La/SSB antibodies. The disease most commonly presents with a diffuse/periorbital rash resembling subacute cutaneous lupus erythematosus and can have systemic abnormalities such as complete heart block or hepatosplenomegaly. Neonatal lupus is usually benign and self-limited. Many of the clinical manifestations are transient, but certain heart problems can be permanent. Diagnosis is based on maternal antibodies and clinical manifestations. Treatment and management is mainly supportive and focused on preventing complete heart block if possible.

== Pathogenesis ==
Ro/SSA and La/SSB are proteins found inside cells. Anti-Ro/SSA and anti-La/SSB are antibodies that form against these proteins. These antibodies can be seen in autoimmune diseases, the most common being Lupus and Sjögren's. Mothers can have these antibodies circulating in their blood without having any signs or symptoms of an autoimmune disease.

Babies born to mothers with these antibodies have a chance of developing neonatal lupus erythematosus. This occurs when maternal anti-Ro/SSA and anti-La/SSB antibodies enter fetal circulation and affect neonatal organs by crossing the placenta using FcRn receptors. The mechanism in which the antibodies affect organs is not yet completely understood. For the heart, it is thought that these antibodies bind to cells in the heart that go through physiologic cell death during embryogenesis. This leads to heart cell injury which causes secondary fibrosis in the conduction system, ultimately causing heart block. These antibodies can also affect calcium channels which are needed to initiate action potentials. Disruption to action potential propagation can affect the AV and SA nodes which are part of the conduction system of the heart.

Fetal susceptibility and environmental factors could also play a role in pathogenesis since not all infants develop congenital heart block even when exposed to antibodies.

== Clinical manifestations ==
Neonatal lupus can present with several signs and symptoms. The most common manifestations involve the heart and skin. Problems involving the liver, gallbladder, brain, and blood can be seen but are usually transient.

=== Heart ===
Cardiac manifestations present more commonly in utero, but can also present after birth. The most common complications are varying degrees of heart block and endocardial fibroelastosis. A large percentage of infants diagnosed with isolated congenital heart block are associated to neonatal lupus. Heart block occurs when there is dysfunction in the conduction system, preventing impulses from traveling from the atria to the ventricles. Heart block can initially present with bradycardia in the prenatal period, usually around the second trimester. Infants with lower grades of heart block can progress to higher grades, but they can also present with rapid onset of complete heart block.It has been suggested that atrioventricular heart block occurs between 18 and 26 weeks of pregnancy when type A or type B auto antigens migrate to the surface of cardiomyocytes after maternal antibodies bind to the fetal cardiac tissue, triggering fibrosis of the atrioventricular node. Endocardial fibroelastosis is considered a type of cardiomyopathy that occurs in response to heart cell injury and can be seen with or without conduction system dysfunction.

Common complications

- First degree heart block
- Second degree heart block
- Third degree heart block (Complete heart block)
- Endocardial fibroelastosis

Other complications seen with neonatal lupus

- Patent ductus arteriosus
- Patent foramen ovale
- Pulmonic stenosis
- Pulmonary valvular dysplasia
- Fusion of chordae tendineae of the tricuspid valve
- Ostium secundum type atrial septal defects

=== Skin ===
A rash can be seen upon delivery. It is commonly found on the head and face, but can also be found on other parts of the body. It is most commonly seen around the eyes. The rash can be described as raised, red, and ring-shaped. The rash is not always visible at birth and can become more prominent after UV light exposure. Antibodies coming from the mother have a certain life span. Because of this, the rash usually lasts 6–8 months, resolving after the maternal antibodies are no longer in circulation. Telangiectasia has also been seen and can occur with or without the ring-shaped rash. Severe rashes can blister, crust, become hyperpigmented, scar, and in rare cases lead to atrophy; rash management includes limiting sun exposure, wearing protective clothing, and if needed, laser-therapy to reduce telangiectasia.

- Red, ring-shaped rash of face and head
- Telangiectasia

=== Liver and gallbladder ===
Severity in which the liver is affected can range from mildly elevated liver enzymes to liver failure.

- Elevated transaminases
- Hyperbilirubinemia
- Cholestasis
- Hepatitis

=== Blood ===
The conditions listed below have been reported with no issues of bleeding or sepsis.

- Anemia
- Neutropenia
- Thrombocytopenia
- Aplastic anemia

=== Brain ===
Although the conditions below have been reported, it is still uncertain that these manifestations are related to anti-Ro/SSA and anti-La/SSB antibodies. Majority of the neurologic conditions were found incidentally with no neurological signs or symptoms present and did not lead to physical disability or need for surgery.

- Hydrocephalus
- Macrocephaly
- Vasculopathy
- Hypocalcemic seizures
- Spastic diplegia

== Diagnosis ==
An infant is diagnosed with neonatal lupus if maternal antibodies, anti-Ro/SSA, anti-La/SSB, or less commonly anti-ribonucleoprotein, are present and if any of the clinical manifestations are present without any other explanation.

=== Screening ===
Screening includes testing for maternal antibodies and evaluating for heart block in utero. Universal screening is not recommended. Screening is usually performed when there is a higher likelihood for neonatal lupus such as individuals who are more likely to have antibodies due to autoimmune diseases or individuals who have had prior pregnancies complicated with neonatal lupus. If a fetus develops heart block, screening for maternal antibodies can be considered. Monitoring for heart block can be done using a fetal echocardiogram.

== Management ==
Infants with neonatal lupus are managed with supportive care. This means treating or monitoring the symptoms that can occur from this disease. For example, avoiding sunlight so that the infant's rash won't worsen. Many of the manifestations are transient, but once complete heart block occurs, it is irreversible. Heart block can be managed in utero if diagnosed during pregnancy. Complete heart block (CHB) carries a 9-25% risk of fetal demise; once it has onset, most children will require a pacemaker, and they face the possibility of developing heart failure due to CHB-related cardiomyopathy. Infants born to mothers with anti-Ro/SSA and anti-La/SSB should have an ECG performed to check for heart abnormalities if none were seen while in the uterus.

=== In utero ===
Fetal heart block treatment varies based on the degree. First degree heart block is usually treated with glucocorticoids, but it can also reverse on its own. As of right now, treatment guidelines for first-degree heart block is controversial due to lack of evidence. Second degree heart block commonly progresses to complete heart block. Second degree heart block can also reverse on its own. Treatment includes fluorinated glucocorticoids and immunoglobulin therapy. Third degree heart block is irreversible, and many treatments have been attempted without success. Management is mainly expectant. Early delivery should be avoided unless other complications arise. In third degree heart block, if the ventricular heart rate drops below 50-55 beats per minute, maternal beta-antagonists can be given. Glucocorticoids and immunoglobulin therapy can be used for endocardial fibroelastosis, but effectiveness is still unclear.

== See also ==
- Congenital heart block
- Lupus erythematosus
