= Cell-bound complement activation products =

Cell-Bound Complement Activation Products (CB-CAPs) or complement split products, refers to complement activation fragments, C4d, that are bound covalently to somatic cells, as a result of activation of the classical complement pathway. They appear potentially useful for the diagnosis of systemic lupus erythematosus as of 2015.

== Medical use ==
CB-CAPs can be used in the diagnosis and monitoring of SLE. Their efficacy is aided by the ability to be measured throughout the lifespans of erythrocytes, b-lymphocytes.

== Research ==
Research into the development of CB-CAPs has been advocated by the Lupus Foundation of America.
