= Canine discoid lupus erythematosus =

Autoimmune disease

Discoid lupus erythematosus (DLE) is an uncommon autoimmune disease of the basal cell layer of the skin. It occurs in humans and cats, more frequently occurring in dogs. It was first described in dogs by Griffin and colleagues in 1979. DLE is one form of cutaneous lupus erythematosus (CLE). DLE occurs in dogs in two forms: a classical facial predominant form or generalized with other areas of the body affected. Other non-discoid variants of CLE include vesicular CLE, exfoliative CLE and mucocutaneous CLE. It does not progress to systemic lupus erythematosus (SLE) in dogs. SLE can also have skin symptoms, but it appears that the two are either separate diseases. DLE in dogs differs from SLE in humans in that plasma cells predominate histologically instead of T lymphocytes. Because worsening of symptoms occurs with increased ultraviolet light exposure, sun exposure most likely plays a role in DLE, although certain breeds (see below) are predisposed. After pemphigus foliaceus, DLE is the second most common autoimmune skin disease in dogs.

== Symptoms ==
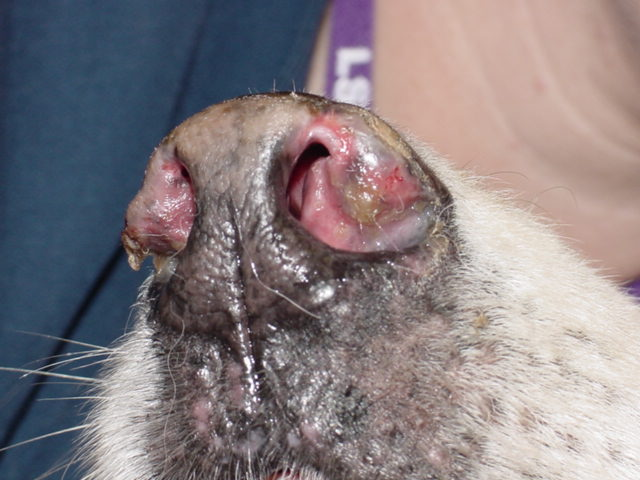
Canine discoid lupus erythematosus showing loss of noseprint, depigmentation, ulceration and tissue destruction - all characteristic of the syndrome

The most common initial symptom is scaling and loss of pigment on the nose. The surface of the nose becomes smooth gray, and ulcerated, instead of the normal black cobblestone texture. Over time the lips, the skin around the eyes, the ears, and the genitals may become involved. Lesions may progress to ulceration and lead to tissue destruction. DLE is often worse in summer due to increased sun exposure.

== Diagnosis ==
DLE is easily confused with solar dermatitis, pemphigus, ringworm, and other types of dermatitis. Biopsy is required to make the distinction. Histopathologically, there is inflammation at the dermoepidermal junction and degeneration of the basal cell layer. Unlike in SLE, an anti-nuclear antibody test is usually negative.

== Treatment ==
Avoiding sun exposure and the use of sunscreens (not containing zinc oxide as this is toxic to dogs) is important. Topical therapy includes corticosteroid and tacrolimus use. Oral vitamin E or omega-3 and omega-6 fatty acids are also used. More refractory cases may require the use of oral niacinamide and tetracycline or immuno-suppressive medication such as corticosteroids, azathioprine, or chlorambucil. Treatment is often lifelong, but there is a good prognosis for long-term remission.

== Commonly affected dog breed ==
- Alaskan Malamute
- Collie
- German Shepherd Dog
- Shetland Sheepdog
- Siberian Husky
- Brittany
- German Shorthaired Pointer
- Africanis
- Rottweilers
