= List of people with lupus =

List of notable people diagnosed with the autoimmune disease Lupus

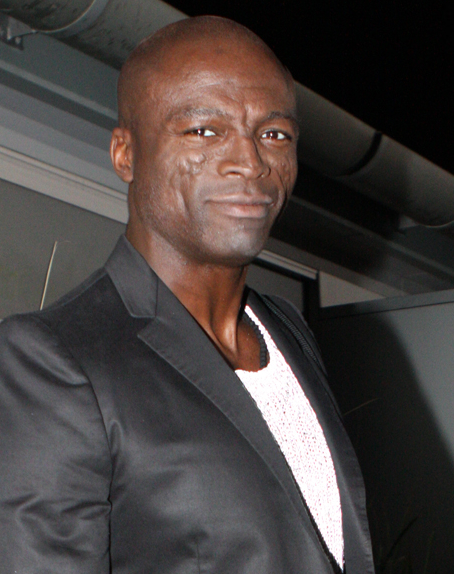
Musician Seal says he's "quite proud" of his "trademark" facial scars from discoid lupus

This is a categorised, alphabetical list of notable people who have been diagnosed with lupus.

Lupus is a collection of autoimmune diseases in which the human immune system becomes hyperactive and attacks healthy tissues. Symptoms of these diseases can affect many different body systems, including joints, skin, kidneys, blood cells, heart, and lungs. The most common and most severe form is systemic lupus erythematosus (SLE).

== Confirmed diagnosis ==
=== Sports ===
- Shannon Boxx, diagnosed in 2007
- Tim Raines, former major league baseball player
- Juli Furtado, champion professional mountain biker

=== Music ===
- Consequence, American rapper, came forth about his diagnoses of lupus on October 1, 2020
- J Dilla (also known as Jay Dee), hip-hop producer and beat maker; died of SLE complications in 2006
- Kéllé Bryan, diagnosed in 1998
- Lucy Vodden, inspiration for the Beatles song "Lucy in the Sky with Diamonds"; since becoming aware of this, Julian Lennon has campaigned to raise awareness of lupus
- Michael Jackson, had both discoid lupus erythematosus and vitiligo; diagnosed in 1986, and confirmed by his dermatologist, Arnold Klein, who presented legal documents during court depositions
- Nick Cannon, American actor and former presenter of America's Got Talent
- Seal, British singer-songwriter
- Selena Gomez, American singer and actress
- Teddi King, American singer; died of SLE complications in 1977
- Toni Braxton, American singer, was hospitalized in Los Angeles in December 2012 because of "minor health issues" related to lupus
- Halsey, American singer-songwriter and actress, disclosed her diagnoses of lupus on June 5, 2024

=== Stage and screen ===
- Inday Ba, actress of Swedish-Senegalese descent; died in 2005 from complications of Lupus
- Tonya Ingram, performance poet and author, died of SLE complications in 2022.
- Sally Hawkins, actress
- Charles Kuralt, former anchor of CBS Sunday Morning, died of SLE complications in 1997
- Lauren Shuler Donner, American movie producer
- Mary Elizabeth McDonough, American actress; believes her SLE to be due to silicone breast implants
- Michael Wayne, Hollywood director and producer; part owner of Batjac Productions; son of John Wayne, died of heart failure resulting from SLE complications in 2003
- Ray Walston, character actor who died of SLE complications in 2001 after a six-year battle with the disease
- Shanelle Gabriel, singer, spoken word artist, music curator, 2007 HBO Def Poet

=== Modeling ===
- Mercedes Scelba-Shorte, America's Next Top Model Season Two runner-up and model
- Sophie Howard, British glamour model

=== Politics ===
- Ferdinand Marcos, former Philippine president, died of SLE complications in 1989
- Hugh Gaitskell, British politician; died of SLE complications in 1963 aged 56

=== Other ===
- Donald Byrne, American chess player who died from SLE complications in 1976
- Flannery O’Connor, American author who died of SLE complications in 1964
- Cori Broadus, business owner of cosmetics brand Choc Factory, Snoop and Shante Broadus daughter.
- Candace J. Semien, journalist and essayist
- Marisa Zeppieri is a journalist, author, Lupus News Today columnist, former Mrs. New York 2015.

== Retrospective diagnosis ==
- Louisa May Alcott, American author best known for her novel Little Women, has been suggested to have had SLE.
- Jane Austen, English author best known for her novel Pride and Prejudice, has been suggested to have had SLE.
