= Lupus headache =

Disorder in patients with systemic lupus erythematosus

Lupus headache is a proposed, specific headache disorder in patients with systemic lupus erythematosus (SLE). Research shows that headache is a symptom commonly described by SLE patients —57% in one meta-analysis, ranging in different studies from 33% to 78%; of which migraine 31.7% and tension-type headache is 23.5%. The existence of a special lupus headache is contested, although few high-quality studies are available to form definitive conclusions.

== Definition ==
Lupus headache is an important item in the Systemic Lupus Erythematosus Disease Activity Index (SLEDAI), a scoring system often used in lupus research. The SLEDAI describes lupus headache as a "severe, persistent headache; may be migrainous, but must be nonresponsive to narcotic analgesia". A score of 8 is given to this item (items are given a relative weight of 1, 2, 4 or 8).

The 1999 American College of Rheumatology case definitions of neuropsychiatric syndromes in SLE do not define lupus headache, but rather propose several headache disorders loosely based on the International Headache Society (IHS) classification.

In the IHS scheme, headache due to lupus would be classified as "Headache attributed to other non-infectious inflammatory disease" (7.3.3). This label requires evidence of a disease flare accompanying the headache, and resolution of the headache with immunosuppressant treatment. However, a meta-analysis found no correlation between headaches and disease activity.

== Criticism ==
Critics of this concept argue that there are no quality studies showing that headaches in patients with SLE differ from those in the general population. A detailed definition of the term lupus headache is lacking, since the terms "severe" and "persistent" are not quantified. Narcotic analgesics are not recommended for migraines or other common headache types. Other definitions from the IHS do not include responsiveness to treatments as a diagnostic criterion. Migraine patients are typically adult women around age 40, a demographic group in which SLE is also more common.

== Mechanism ==
Some (but not all) studies have shown an association between (migraine) headaches in SLE and associated Raynaud's phenomenon and/or anti-cardiolipin antibodies. Further studies are needed however to prove the underlying assumption that cerebral vasospasm causes migraines in lupus patients.

== Diagnosis ==
Although specific complications of SLE may cause headache (such as cerebral venous sinus thrombosis or posterior reversible encephalopathy syndrome), it remains unclear whether specific investigations (such as lumbar puncture or magnetic resonance imaging, MRI) are needed in lupus patients presenting with headache. Although studies using MRI or single-photon emission computed tomography (SPECT) often find abnormalities, the value of these findings remains unclear, and they have not been able to distinguish a special "lupus headache" from other headache types in people with lupus.
