= Verrucous perforating collagenoma =

- Specialty: Dermatology

Verrucous perforating collagenoma is a very rare skin disorder which presents (clinically) with verrucous papules with a transepidermal elimination of collagen.

== See also ==
- Linear verrucous epidermal nevus
- List of cutaneous conditions
