= Lupus =

Autoimmune disease in which the immune system attacks healthy tissue

- Other names: Systemic lupus erythematosus (SLE)
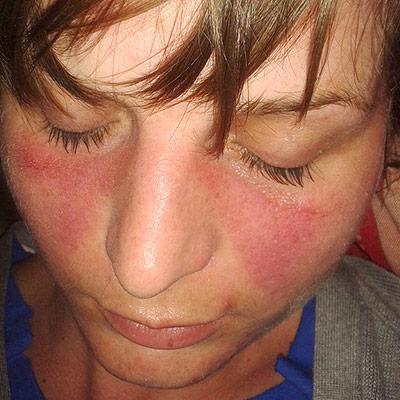
- Young woman with the distinctive butterfly rash that many individuals with lupus experience
- Pronunciation: /sɪˈstɛmɪk ˈluːpəs ˌɛrɪθiːməˈtoʊsəs/ sist-EM-ik LOO-pəs ERR-ith-ee-mə-TOH-səs
- Specialty: Rheumatology
- Symptoms: Painful and swollen joints, fever, chest pain, hair loss, mouth ulcers, swollen lymph nodes, feeling tired, red rash
- Usual onset: 15–45 years of age
- Duration: Long term
- Causes: Unclear
- Diagnostic method: Based on symptoms and blood tests
- Medication: NSAIDs, corticosteroids, immunosuppressants, hydroxychloroquine, methotrexate
- Prognosis: 15 year survival ~80%
- Frequency: 2–7 per 10,000

Lupus, formally called systemic lupus erythematosus (SLE), is an autoimmune disease in which the body's immune system mistakenly attacks healthy tissue in many parts of the body. Symptoms vary among people and may be mild to severe. Common symptoms include painful and swollen joints, fever, chest pain, hair loss, mouth ulcers, swollen lymph nodes, feeling tired, and a red rash which is most commonly on the face. Often there are periods of illness, called flares, and periods of remission during which there are few symptoms. Children up to 18 years old develop a more severe form of SLE termed childhood-onset systemic lupus erythematosus.

Lupus is Latin for "wolf": the disease was so-named in the 13th century as the rash was thought to resemble a wolf's bite.

The cause of SLE is not clear. It is thought to involve a combination of genetics and environmental factors. Among identical twins, if one is affected there is a 24% chance the other one will also develop the disease. Female sex hormones, sunlight, smoking, vitamin D deficiency, and certain infections are also believed to increase a person's risk. The mechanism involves an immune response by autoantibodies against a person's own tissues. These are most commonly anti-nuclear antibodies and they result in inflammation. Diagnosis can be difficult and is based on a combination of symptoms and laboratory tests. There are a number of other kinds of lupus erythematosus including discoid lupus erythematosus, neonatal lupus, and subacute cutaneous lupus erythematosus.

There is no cure for SLE, but there are experimental and symptomatic treatments. Treatments may include NSAIDs, corticosteroids, immunosuppressants, hydroxychloroquine, and methotrexate. Although corticosteroids are rapidly effective, long-term use results in side effects. Alternative medicine has not been shown to affect the disease. Men have higher mortality. SLE significantly increases the risk of cardiovascular disease, with this being the most common cause of death. While women with lupus have higher-risk pregnancies, most are successful.

Rate of SLE varies between countries from 20 to 70 per 100,000. Women of childbearing age are affected about nine times more often than men. While it most commonly begins between the ages of 15 and 45, a wide range of ages can be affected. Those of African, Caribbean, and Chinese descent are at higher risk than those of European descent. Rates of disease in the developing world are unclear.

== Signs and symptoms ==
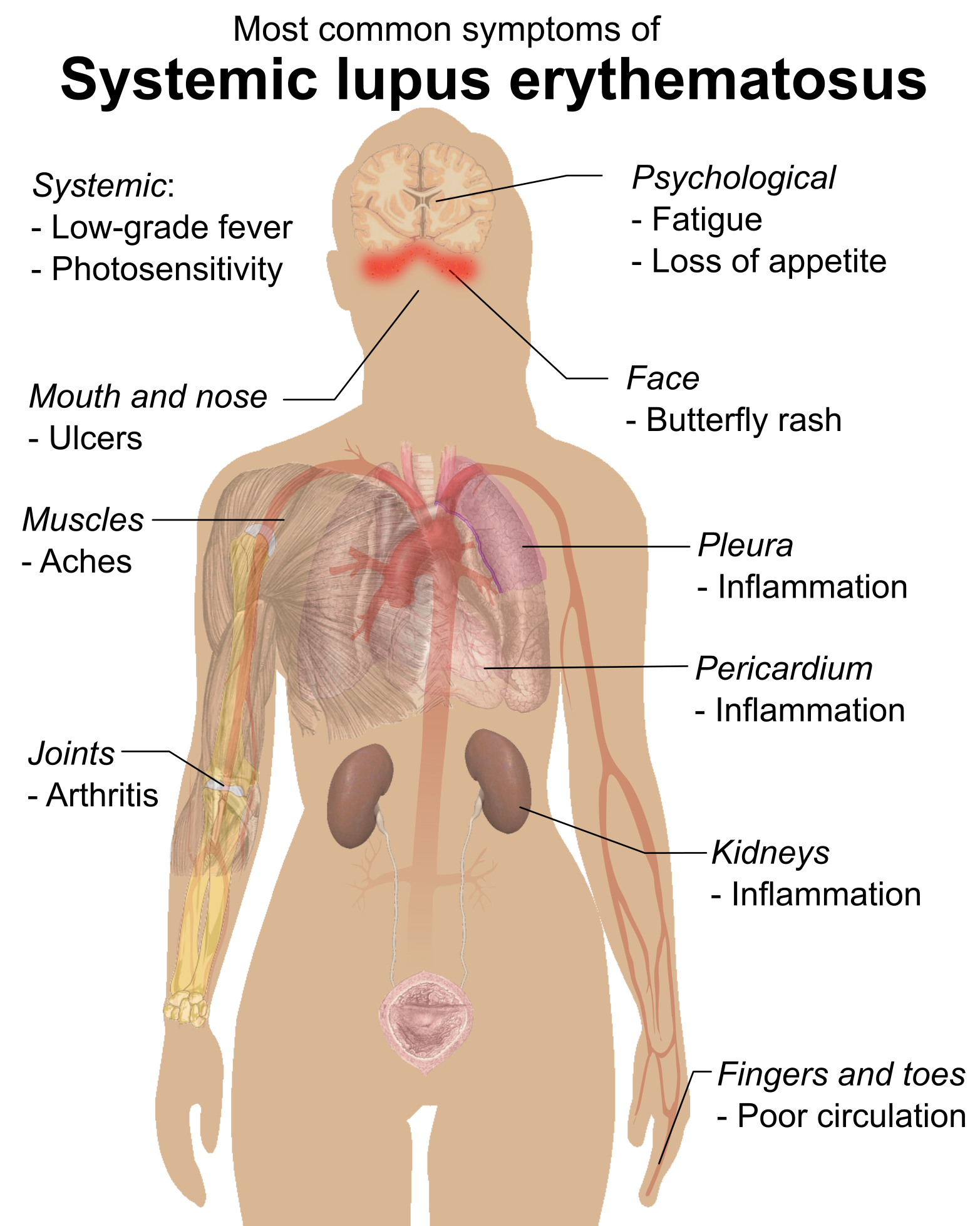
Common symptoms of SLE

SLE is one of several diseases known as "the great imitator" because it often mimics or is mistaken for other illnesses. SLE is a classical item in differential diagnosis, because SLE symptoms vary widely and come and go unpredictably. Diagnosis can thus be elusive, with some people having unexplained symptoms of SLE for years before a definitive diagnosis is reached.

Common initial and chronic complaints include fever, malaise, joint pains, muscle pains, and fatigue. Because these symptoms are so often seen in association with other diseases, these signs and symptoms are not part of the diagnostic criteria for SLE. When occurring in conjunction with other signs and symptoms, however, they are considered suggestive.

While SLE can occur in both males and females, it is found far more often in women, and the symptoms associated with each sex are different. Females tend to have a greater number of relapses, a low white blood cell count, more arthritis, Raynaud syndrome, and psychiatric symptoms. Males tend to have more seizures, kidney disease, serositis (inflammation of tissues lining the lungs and heart), skin problems, and peripheral neuropathy.

=== Skin ===
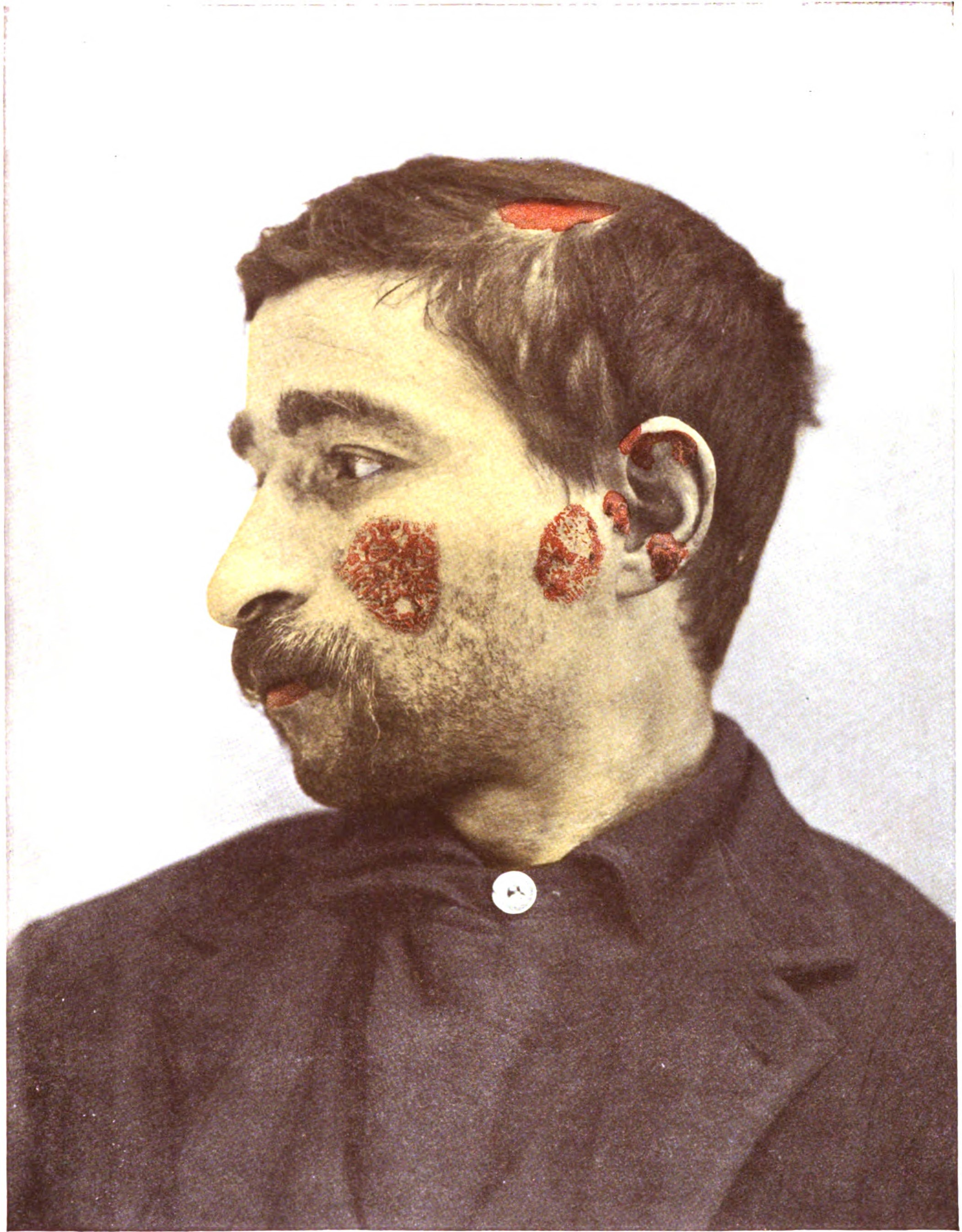
Lupus patches on the cheek, ear, and scalp

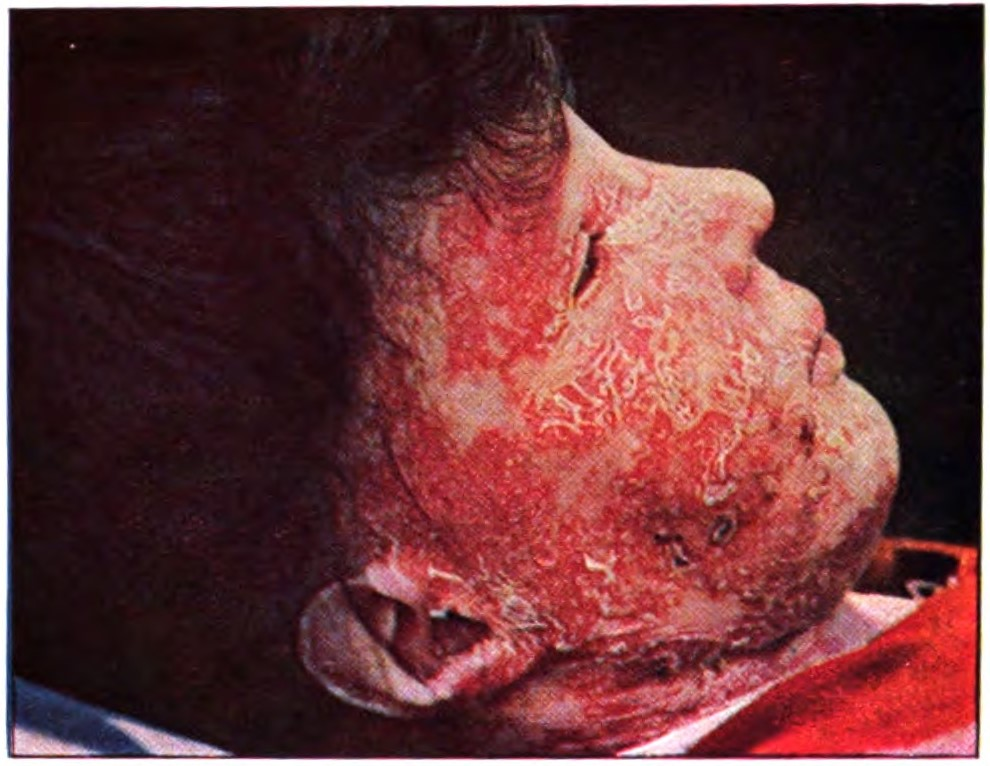
Widespread lupus patches across the face with an epithelioma

As many as 70% of people with lupus have some skin symptoms. The three main categories of lesions are chronic cutaneous (discoid) lupus, subacute cutaneous lupus, and acute cutaneous lupus. People with discoid lupus may exhibit thick, red scaly patches on the skin. Similarly, subacute cutaneous lupus manifests as red, scaly patches of skin but with distinct edges. Acute cutaneous lupus manifests as a rash. Some have the classic malar rash (commonly known as the butterfly rash) associated with the disease. This rash occurs in 30–60% of people with SLE.

Hair loss, mouth and nasal ulcers, and lesions on the skin are other possible manifestations.

=== Muscles and bones ===
The most commonly sought medical attention is for joint pain, with the small joints of the hand and wrist usually affected, although all joints are at risk. More than 90 percent of those affected will experience joint or muscle pain at some time during the course of their illness. Unlike rheumatoid arthritis, lupus arthritis is less disabling and usually does not cause severe destruction of the joints. Fewer than ten percent of people with lupus arthritis will develop deformities of the hands and feet. People with SLE are at particular risk of developing osteoarticular tuberculosis.

A possible association between rheumatoid arthritis and SLE has been suggested, and SLE may be associated with an increased risk of bone fractures in relatively young women.

=== Blood ===
Anemia is common in children with SLE and develops in about 50% of cases. Low platelet count (thrombocytopenia) and low white blood cell count (leukopenia) may be due to the disease or a side effect of pharmacological treatment. People with SLE may have an association with antiphospholipid antibody syndrome (a thrombotic disorder), wherein autoantibodies to phospholipids are present in their serum. Abnormalities associated with antiphospholipid antibody syndrome include a paradoxical prolonged partial thromboplastin time (which usually occurs in hemorrhagic disorders) and a positive test for antiphospholipid antibodies; the combination of such findings have earned the term "lupus anticoagulant-positive". Another autoantibody finding in SLE is the anti-cardiolipin antibody, which can cause a false positive test for syphilis.

=== Heart ===
SLE may cause pericarditis (inflammation of the outer lining surrounding the heart), myocarditis (inflammation of the heart muscle), or endocarditis (inflammation of the inner lining of the heart). The endocarditis of SLE is non-infectious, and is also called Libman–Sacks endocarditis. It involves either the mitral valve or the tricuspid valve. Atherosclerosis also occurs more often and advances more rapidly than in the general population.

Steroids are sometimes prescribed as an anti-inflammatory treatment for lupus; however, they can increase one's risk for heart disease, high cholesterol, and atherosclerosis.

=== Lungs ===
SLE can cause pleuritic pain as well as inflammation of the pleurae known as pleurisy, which can rarely give rise to shrinking lung syndrome involving a reduced lung volume. Other associated lung conditions include pneumonitis, chronic diffuse interstitial lung disease, pulmonary hypertension, pulmonary emboli, and pulmonary hemorrhage.

=== Kidneys ===
Painless passage of blood or protein in the urine may often be the only presenting sign of kidney involvement. Acute or chronic renal impairment may develop with lupus nephritis, leading to acute or end-stage kidney failure. Because of early recognition and management of SLE with immunosuppressive drugs or corticosteroids, end-stage renal failure occurs in less than 5% of cases, except in the black population, where the risk is many times higher.

The histological hallmark of SLE is membranous glomerulonephritis with "wire loop" abnormalities. This finding is due to immune complex deposition along the glomerular basement membrane, leading to a typical granular appearance in immunofluorescence testing.

=== Neuropsychiatric ===
Neuropsychiatric syndromes can result when SLE affects the central or peripheral nervous system. The American College of Rheumatology defines 19 neuropsychiatric syndromes in systemic lupus erythematosus. The diagnosis of neuropsychiatric syndromes concurrent with SLE (now termed as NPSLE), is one of the most difficult challenges in medicine, because it can involve so many different patterns of symptoms, some of which may be mistaken for signs of infectious disease or stroke.

A common neurological disorder people with SLE have is headache, although the existence of a specific lupus headache and the optimal approach to headache in SLE cases remains controversial. Other common neuropsychiatric manifestations of SLE include cognitive disorder, mood disorder, cerebrovascular disease, seizures, polyneuropathy, anxiety disorder, psychosis, depression, and in some extreme cases, personality disorders. Steroid psychosis can also occur as a result of treating the disease. It can rarely present with intracranial hypertension syndrome, characterized by an elevated intracranial pressure, papilledema, and headache with occasional abducens nerve paresis, absence of a space-occupying lesion or ventricular enlargement, and normal cerebrospinal fluid chemical and hematological constituents.

More rare manifestations are acute confusional state, Guillain–Barré syndrome, aseptic meningitis, autonomic disorder, demyelinating syndrome, mononeuropathy (which might manifest as mononeuritis multiplex), movement disorder (more specifically, chorea), myasthenia gravis, myelopathy, cranial neuropathy and plexopathy.

Neurological disorders contribute to a significant percentage of morbidity and mortality in people with lupus. As a result, the neural side of lupus is being studied in hopes of reducing morbidity and mortality rates. One aspect of this disease is severe damage to the epithelial cells of the blood–brain barrier. In certain regions, depression affects up to 60% of women with SLE.

=== Eyes ===
Up to one-third of patients report that their eyes are affected. The most common diseases are dry eye syndrome and secondary Sjögren's disease, but episcleritis, scleritis, retinopathy (more often affecting both eyes than one), ischemic optic neuropathy, retinal detachment, and secondary angle-closure glaucoma may occur. In addition, the medications used to treat SLE can cause eye disease: long-term glucocorticoid use can cause cataracts and secondary open-angle glaucoma, and long-term hydroxychloroquine treatment can cause vortex keratopathy and maculopathy.

=== Reproductive ===
While most pregnancies have positive outcomes, there is a greater risk of adverse events occurring during pregnancy. SLE causes an increased rate of fetal death in utero and spontaneous abortion (miscarriage). The overall live-birth rate in people with SLE has been estimated to be 72%. Pregnancy outcome appears to be worse in people with SLE whose disease flares up during pregnancy.

Neonatal lupus is the occurrence of SLE symptoms in an infant born from a mother with SLE, most commonly presenting with a rash resembling discoid lupus erythematosus, and sometimes with systemic abnormalities such as heart block or enlargement of the liver and spleen. Neonatal lupus is usually benign and self-limited.

Medications for treatment of SLE can carry severe risks for female and male reproduction. Cyclophosphamide can lead to infertility by causing premature ovarian insufficiency (POI), the loss of normal function of one's ovaries prior to age forty. Methotrexate can cause termination or deformity in fetuses and is a common abortifacient, and for men taking a high dose and planning to father children, a discontinuation period of six months is recommended before insemination.

=== Systemic ===
Fatigue in SLE is probably multifactorial and has been related to not only disease activity or complications such as anemia or hypothyroidism, but also to pain, depression, poor sleep quality, poor physical fitness and lack of social support.

== Causes ==
=== Vitamin D deficiency ===
Some studies have found that vitamin D deficiency (i.e., a low serum level of vitamin D) often occurs in patients with SLE and that its level is particularly low in patients with more active SLE. Furthermore, five studies reported that SLE patients treated with vitamin D had significant reductions in the activity of their disease. However, other studies have found that the levels of vitamin D in SLE are not low, that vitamin D does not reduce their SLE's activity, and/or that the vitamin D levels and responses to vitamin D treatment varied in different patient populations (i.e., varied based on whether the study was conducted on individuals living in Africa or Europe). Because of these conflicting findings, the following middle ground has been proposed for using vitamin D to treat SLE: a) patients with SLE that have 25-hydroxyvitamin D_{2} plus 25-hydroxyvitamin D_{3} serum levels less than 30 ng/ml should be treated with vitamin D to keep these levels at or above 30 ng/ml or, in patients having major SLE-related organ involvement, at 36 to 40 ng/ml and b) patients with 25-hydroxyvitamin D_{2} plus 25-hydroxyvitamin D_{3} levels at or above 30 ng/ml should not be treated with vitamin D unless they have major SLE-related organ involvement in which case they should be treated with 25-hydroxyvitamin D_{2} plus 25-hydroxyvitamin D_{3} to maintain their serum vitamin D levels between 36 and 40 ng/ml.

=== Genetics ===
Studies of identical twins (i.e., twins that develop from the same fertilized egg) and genome-wide association studies have identified numerous genes that by themselves promote the development of SLE, particularly childhood-onset SLE, i.e., cSLE, in rare cases of SLE/cSLE. The single-gene (also termed monogenic) causes of cSLE (or a cSLE-like disorder) develop in individuals before they reach 18 years of age. cSLE typically is more severe and potentially lethal than adult-onset SLE because it often involves SLE-induced neurologic disease, renal failure, and/or the macrophage activation syndrome. Mutations in about 40 genes have been reported to cause cSLE and/or a cSLE-like disease. These genes include five which as of February, 2024 were classified as inborn errors of immunity genes, i.e., DNASE1L3, TREX1, IFIH1, Tartrate-resistant acid phosphatase and PRKCD and 28 other genes, i.e., NEIL3, TMEM173, ADAR1, NRAS, SAMHD1, SOS1, FASLG, FAS receptor gene, RAG1, RAG2, DNASE1, SHOC2, KRAS, PTPN11, PTEN, BLK, RNASEH2A, RNASEH2B, RNASEH2C, Complement component 1qA, Complement component 1qB, Complement component 1r, Complement component 1s, Complement component 2, Complement component 3, UNC93B1, and the two complement component 4 genes, C4A and C4B. (The C4A and C4B genes code, respectively, for complement component A and complement component B proteins. These two proteins combine to form the complement component 4 protein which plays various roles in regulating immune function. Individuals normally have multiple copies of the C4A and C4B gene but if they have reduced levels of one and/or both of these genes make low levels of complement component 4 protein and thereby are at risk for developing cSLE or a cSLE-like disorders.) (Note that mutations in the UNC93B1 gene may cause either cSLE or the chilblain lupus erythematosus form of cSLE.)

Mutations in a wide range of other genes do not by themselves cause SLE, but two or more of them may act together, act in concert with environmental factors, or act in some but not other populations (e.g., cause SLE in Chinese people but not Europeans) to cause SLE or an SLE-like syndrome, or do so in only a small percentage of cases. The development of a genetically-regulated trait or disorder that is dependent on the inheritance of two or more genes is termed oligogenic inheritance or polygenic inheritance.

SLE is regarded as a prototype disease due to the significant overlap in its symptoms with other autoimmune diseases.

Patients with SLE have higher levels of DNA damage than normal subjects, and several proteins involved in the preservation of genomic stability show polymorphisms, some of which increase the risk for SLE development. Defective DNA repair is a likely mechanism underlying lupus development.

=== Drug-induced SLE ===
Drug-induced lupus erythematosus is a (generally) reversible condition that usually occurs in people being treated for a long-term illness. Drug-induced lupus mimics SLE. However, symptoms of drug-induced lupus generally disappear once the medication that triggered the episode is stopped. While there are no established criteria for diagnosing drug-induced SLE, most authors have agreed on the following definition: the afflicted patient had a sufficient and continuing exposure to the drug, at least one symptom compatible with SLE, no history suggestive of SLE before starting the drug, and resolution of symptoms within weeks or months after stopping intake of the drug. The VigiBase drug safety data repositor diagnosed 12,166 cases of drug-induced SLE recorded between 1968 and 2017. Among the 118 agents causing SLE, five main classes were most often associated with drug-induced SLE. These drugs were antiarrhythmic agents such as procainamide or quinidine; antihypertensive agents such as hydralazine, captopril, or acebutolol; antimicrobial agents such as minocycline, isoniazid, carbamazepine, or phenytoin; and agents that inhibit the inflammation-inducing actions of interferon or tumor necrosis factor.

=== Epstein-Barr virus ===
A Stanford University study (published November 2025) suggests a mechanism by which the Epstein-Barr virus leads to development of SLE: EBV infection reprograms autoreactive antinuclear antigen B cells to drive autoimmunity in SLE.

=== Non-systemic forms of lupus ===
Discoid (cutaneous) lupus is limited to skin symptoms and is diagnosed by biopsy of rash on the face, neck, scalp or arms. Approximately 5% of people with DLE progress to SLE.

== Pathophysiology ==
SLE is triggered by environmental factors that are unknown. In SLE, the body's immune system produces antibodies against self-protein, particularly against proteins in the cell nucleus. These antibody attacks are the immediate cause of SLE.

SLE is a chronic inflammatory disease believed to be a type III hypersensitivity response with potential type II involvement. Reticulate and stellate acral pigmentation should be considered a possible manifestation of SLE and high titers of anti-cardiolipin antibodies, or a consequence of therapy.

People with SLE have intense polyclonal B-cell activation, with a population shift towards immature B cells. Memory B cells with increased CD27+/IgD—are less susceptible to immunosuppression. CD27-/IgD- memory B cells are associated with increased disease activity and renal lupus. T cells, which regulate B-cell responses and infiltrate target tissues, have defects in signaling, adhesion, co-stimulation, gene transcription, and alternative splicing. The cytokines B-lymphocyte stimulator (BLyS), also known as B-cell activating factor (BAFF), interleukin 6, interleukin 17, interleukin 18, type I interferons, and tumor necrosis factor α (TNFα) are involved in the inflammatory process and are potential therapeutic targets.

SLE is associated with low C3 levels in the complement system.

=== Cell death signaling ===
- Apoptosis is increased in monocytes and keratinocytes.
- Expression of Fas by B cells and T cells is increased.
- There is a correlation between the apoptotic rates of lymphocytes and disease activity.
- Necrosis is increased in T lymphocytes.

Tingible body macrophages (TBMs) – large phagocytic cells in the germinal centers of secondary lymph nodes – express CD68 protein. These cells normally engulf B cells that have undergone apoptosis after somatic hypermutation. In some people with SLE, significantly fewer TBMs can be found, and these cells rarely contain material from apoptotic B cells. Also, uningested apoptotic nuclei can be found outside of TBMs. This material may present a threat to the tolerization of B cells and T cells. Dendritic cells in the germinal center may endocytose such antigenic material and present it to T cells, activating them. Also, apoptotic chromatin and nuclei may attach to the surfaces of follicular dendritic cells and make this material available for activating other B cells that may have randomly acquired self-protein specificity through somatic hypermutation. Necrosis, a pro-inflammatory form of cell death, is increased in T lymphocytes, due to mitochondrial dysfunction, oxidative stress, and depletion of ATP.

=== Clearance deficiency ===
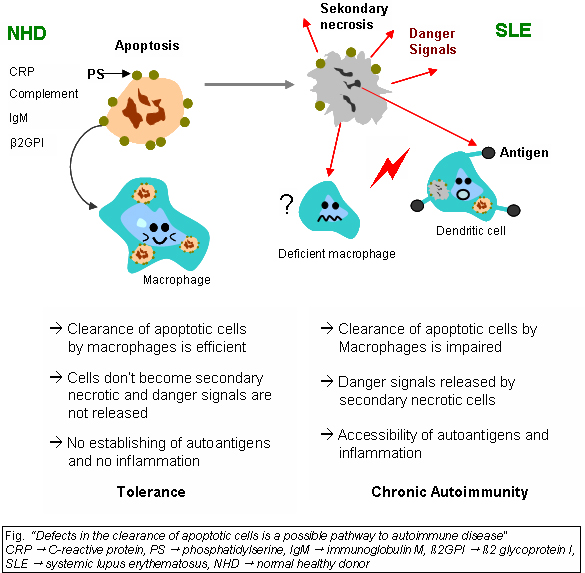
Clearance deficiency

Impaired clearance of dying cells is a potential pathway for the development of this systemic autoimmune disease. This includes deficient phagocytic activity, impaired lysosomal degradation, and scant serum components in addition to increased apoptosis.

SLE is associated with defects in apoptotic clearance, and the damaging effects caused by apoptotic debris. Early apoptotic cells express "eat-me" signals, of cell-surface proteins such as phosphatidylserine, that prompt immune cells to engulf them. Apoptotic cells also express find-me signals to attract macrophages and dendritic cells. When apoptotic material is not removed correctly by phagocytes, they are captured instead by antigen-presenting cells, which leads to the development of antinuclear antibodies.

Monocytes isolated from whole blood of people with SLE show reduced expression of CD44 surface molecules involved in the uptake of apoptotic cells. Most of the monocytes and tingible body macrophages (TBMs), which are found in the germinal centres of lymph nodes, even show a definitely different morphology; they are smaller or scarce and die earlier. Serum components like complement factors, CRP, and some glycoproteins are, furthermore, decisively important for an efficiently operating phagocytosis. With SLE, these components are often missing, diminished, or inefficient.

Macrophages during SLE fail to mature their lysosomes and as a result have impaired degradation of internalized apoptotic debris, which results in chronic activation of Toll-like receptors and permeabilization of the phagolysosomal membrane, allowing activation of cytosolic sensors. In addition, intact apoptotic debris recycles back to the cell membrane and accumulate on the surface of the cell.

Recent research has found an association between certain people with lupus (especially those with lupus nephritis) and an impairment in degrading neutrophil extracellular traps (NETs). These were due to DNAse1 inhibiting factors, or NET protecting factors in people's serum, rather than abnormalities in the DNAse1 itself. DNAse1 mutations in lupus have so far only been found in some Japanese cohorts.

The clearance of early apoptotic cells is an important function in multicellular organisms. It leads to a progression of the apoptosis process and finally to secondary necrosis of the cells if this ability is disturbed. Necrotic cells release nuclear fragments as potential autoantigens, as well as internal danger signals, inducing maturation of dendritic cells (DCs) since they have lost their membranes' integrity. Increased appearance of apoptotic cells also stimulates inefficient clearance. That leads to the maturation of DCs and also to the presentation of intracellular antigens of late apoptotic or secondary necrotic cells, via MHC molecules.

Autoimmunity possibly results from the extended exposure to nuclear and intracellular autoantigens derived from late apoptotic and secondary necrotic cells. B and T cell tolerance for apoptotic cells is abrogated, and the lymphocytes get activated by these autoantigens; inflammation and the production of autoantibodies by plasma cells is initiated. A clearance deficiency in the skin for apoptotic cells has also been observed in people with cutaneous lupus erythematosus (CLE).

=== Germinal centers ===
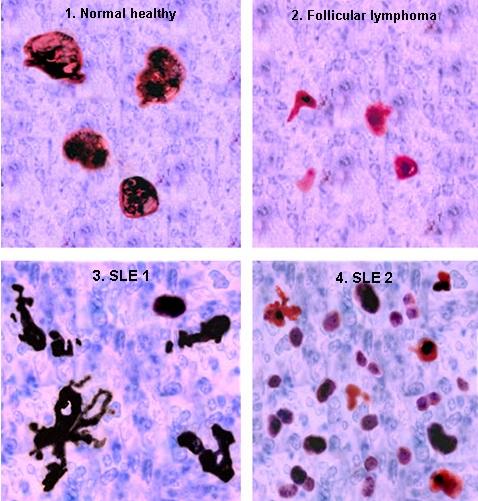
Germinal centres in a person with SLE and controls (schematic). Red: CD68 in tingible body macrophages; black: TUNEL positive apoptotic cells. 1) Healthy donors with florid germinal centres show giant tingible body macrophages (TBM) containing ingested apoptotic cells and no uningested apoptotic cells outside the TBM. 2) People with follicular lymphoma show small tingible body macrophages (TBM) containing few ingested apoptotic cells; however, there are no uningested apoptotic cells outside the TBM. 3) Some with SLE (1) show a lack of TBM and many uningested apoptotic cells decorating the surfaces of spindle-shaped cells, presumably follicular dendritic cells (SLE 1). 4) Some people with SLE show TBM containing few ingested apoptotic cells and many uningested apoptotic cells outside the TBM (SLE 2). However, about 50% of people with SLE show rather normal germinal centre.

In healthy conditions, apoptotic lymphocytes are removed in germinal centers (GC) by specialized phagocytes, the tingible body macrophages (TBM), which is why no free apoptotic and potential autoantigenic material can be seen. In some people with SLE, a buildup of apoptotic debris can be observed in GC because of an ineffective clearance of apoptotic cells. Close to TBM, follicular dendritic cells (FDC) are localised in GC, which attach antigen material to their surface and, in contrast to bone marrow-derived DC, neither take it up nor present it via MHC molecules.

Autoreactive B cells can accidentally emerge during somatic hypermutation and migrate into the germinal center light zone. Autoreactive B cells, maturated coincidentally, normally do not receive survival signals by antigen planted on follicular dendritic cells and perish by apoptosis. In the case of clearance deficiency, apoptotic nuclear debris accumulates in the light zone of GC and gets attached to FDC.

This serves as a germinal centre survival signal for autoreactive B-cells. After migration into the mantle zone, autoreactive B cells require further survival signals from autoreactive helper T cells, which promote the maturation of autoantibody-producing plasma cells and B memory cells. In the presence of autoreactive T cells, a chronic autoimmune disease may be the consequence.

=== Anti-nRNP autoimmunity ===
Anti-nRNP autoantibodies to nRNP A and nRNP C initially targeted restricted, proline-rich motifs. Antibody binding subsequently spread to other epitopes. The similarity and cross-reactivity between the initial targets of nRNP and Sm autoantibodies identifies a likely commonality in cause and a focal point for intermolecular epitope spreading.

=== Others ===
Elevated expression of HMGB1 was found in the sera of people and mice with systemic lupus erythematosus, high mobility group box 1 (HMGB1) is a nuclear protein participating in chromatin architecture and transcriptional regulation. Recently, there is increasing evidence HMGB1 contributes to the pathogenesis of chronic inflammatory and autoimmune diseases due to its inflammatory and immune stimulating properties.

== Diagnosis ==
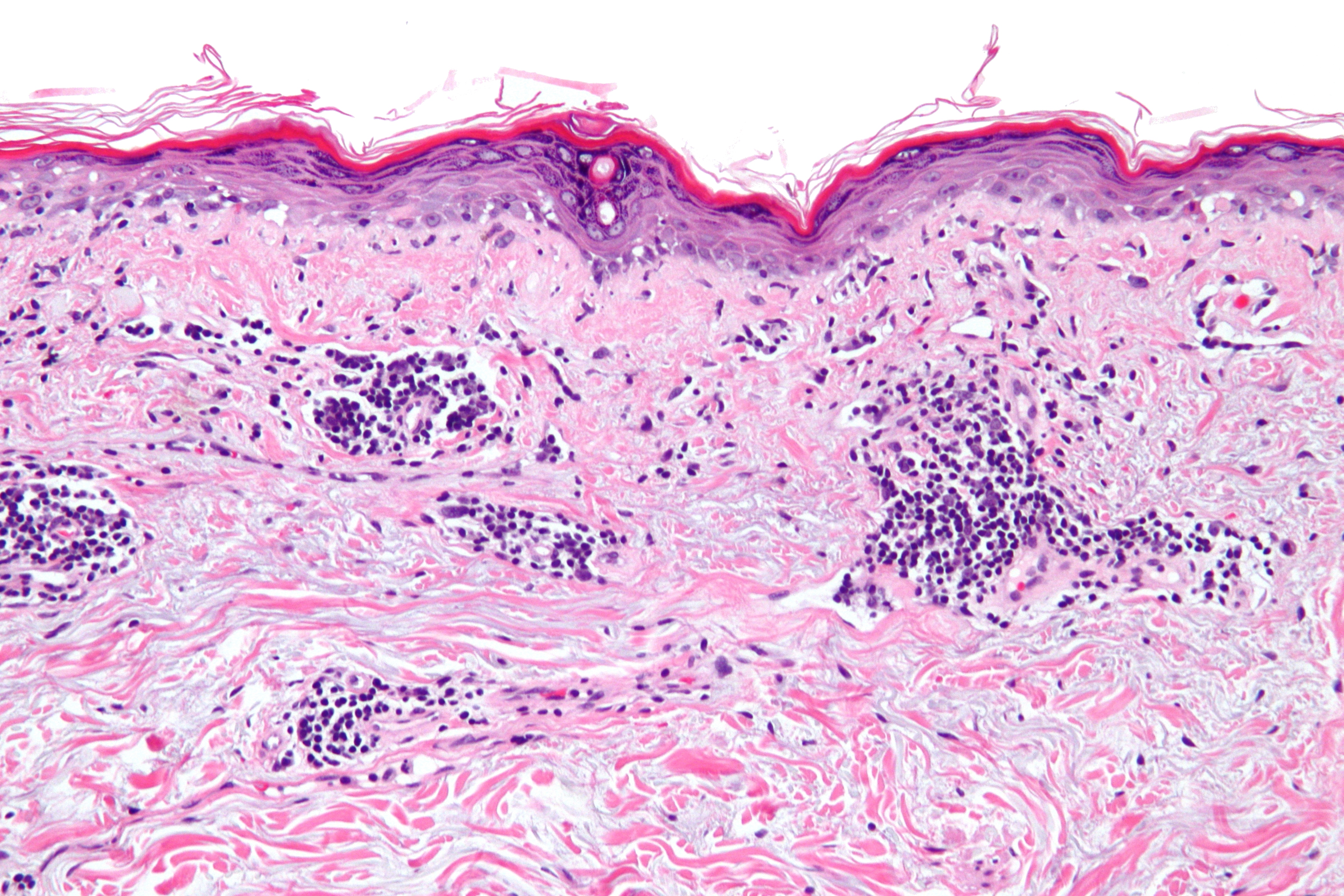
Micrograph showing vacuolar interface dermatitis, as may be seen in SLE. H&E stain.

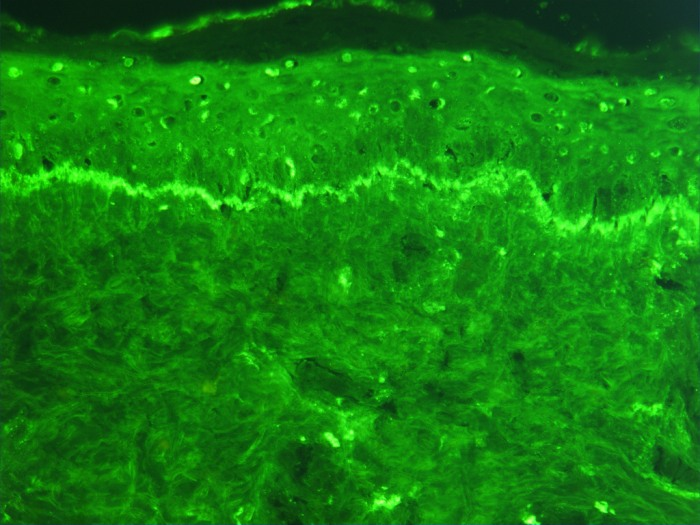
Micrograph of a section of human skin prepared for direct immunofluorescence using an anti-IgG antibody. The skin is from a person with systemic lupus erythematosus and shows IgG deposits at two different places. The first is a bandlike deposit along the epidermal basement membrane ("lupus band test" is positive); the second is within the nuclei of the epidermal cells (antinuclear antibodies are present).

=== Laboratory tests ===
Antinuclear antibody (ANA) testing and anti-extractable nuclear antigen (anti-ENA) form the mainstay of serologic testing for SLE. ANA testing for lupus is highly sensitive, with the vast majority of individuals with lupus testing positive; but the test is not specific, as a positive result may or may not be indicative of lupus.

Several techniques are used to detect ANAs. The most widely used is indirect immunofluorescence (IF). The pattern of fluorescence suggests the type of antibody present in the people's serum. Direct immunofluorescence can detect deposits of immunoglobulins and complement proteins in people's skin. When skin not exposed to the sun is tested, a positive direct IF (the so-called lupus band test) is evidence of systemic lupus erythematosus.

ANA screening yields positive results in many connective tissue disorders and other autoimmune diseases, and may occur in normal individuals. Subtypes of antinuclear antibodies include anti-Smith and anti-double stranded DNA (anti-dsDNA) antibodies (which are linked to SLE) and anti-histone antibodies (which are linked to drug-induced lupus). Anti-dsDNA antibodies are highly specific for SLE; they are present in 70% of cases, whereas they appear in only 0.5% of people without SLE.

Laboratory tests can also help distinguish between closely related connective tissue diseases. A multianalyte panel (MAP) of autoantibodies, including ANA, anti-dsDNA, and anti-Smith in combination with the measurement of cell-bound complement activation products (CB-CAPs) with an integrated algorithm has demonstrated 80% diagnostic sensitivity and 86% specificity in differentiating diagnosed SLE from other autoimmune connective tissue diseases. The MAP approach has been further studied in over 40,000 patients tested with either the MAP or traditional ANA testing strategy (tANA), demonstrating patients who test MAP positive are at up to 6-fold increased odds of receiving a new SLE diagnosis and up to 3-fold increased odds of starting a new SLE medication regimen as compared to patients testing positive with the tANA approach.

The anti-dsDNA antibody titers also tend to reflect disease activity, although not in all cases. Other ANA that may occur in people with SLE are anti-U1 RNP (which also appears in systemic sclerosis and mixed connective tissue disease), SS-A (or anti-Ro) and SS-B (or anti-La; both of which are more common in Sjögren's disease). SS-A and SS-B confer a specific risk for heart conduction block in neonatal lupus.

Other tests routinely performed in suspected SLE are complement system levels (low levels suggest consumption by the immune system), electrolytes and kidney function (disturbed if the kidney is involved), liver enzymes, and complete blood count.

The lupus erythematosus (LE) cell test was commonly used for diagnosis, but it is no longer used because the LE cells are only found in 50–75% of SLE cases and they are also found in some people with rheumatoid arthritis, scleroderma, and drug sensitivities. Because of this, the LE cell test is now performed only rarely and is mostly of historical significance.

=== Diagnostic criteria ===
Some physicians make a diagnosis based on the American College of Rheumatology (ACR) classification criteria. However, these criteria were primarily established for use in scientific research, including selection for randomized controlled trials, which require higher confidence levels. As a result, many people with SLE may not meet the full ACR criteria.

==== Criteria ====
The American College of Rheumatology (ACR) established eleven criteria in 1982, which were revised in 1997 as a classificatory instrument to operationalise the definition of SLE in clinical trials. They were not intended to be used to diagnose individuals and do not do well in that capacity. For the purpose of identifying people for clinical studies, a person has SLE if any 4 out of 11 symptoms are present simultaneously or serially on two separate occasions.

1. Malar rash (rash on cheeks); sensitivity = 57%; specificity = 96%.
2. Discoid rash (red, scaly patches on skin that cause scarring); sensitivity = 18%; specificity = 99%.
3. Serositis: Pleurisy (inflammation of the membrane around the lungs) or pericarditis (inflammation of the membrane around the heart); sensitivity = 56%; specificity = 86% (pleural is more sensitive; cardiac is more specific).
4. Oral ulcers (includes oral or nasopharyngeal ulcers); sensitivity = 27%; specificity = 96%.
5. Arthritis: nonerosive arthritis of two or more peripheral joints, with tenderness, swelling, or effusion; sensitivity = 86%; specificity = 37%.
6. Photosensitivity (exposure to ultraviolet light causes rash, or other symptoms of SLE flareups); sensitivity = 43%; specificity = 96%.
7. Blood—hematologic disorder—hemolytic anemia (low red blood cell count), leukopenia (white blood cell count<4000/μL), lymphopenia (<1500/μL), or low platelet count (<100000/μL) in the absence of offending drug; sensitivity = 59%; specificity = 89%. Hypocomplementemia is also seen, due to either consumption of C3 and C4 by immune complex-induced inflammation or to congenitally complement deficiency, which may predispose to SLE.
8. Renal disorder: More than 0.5 g per day protein in urine or cellular casts seen in urine under a microscope; sensitivity = 51%; specificity = 94%.
9. Antinuclear antibody test positive; sensitivity = 99%; specificity = 49%.
10. Immunologic disorder: Positive anti-Smith, anti-ds DNA, antiphospholipid antibody, or false positive serological test for syphilis; sensitivity = 85%; specificity = 93%. Presence of anti-ss DNA in 70% of cases (though also positive with rheumatic disease and healthy persons).
11. Neurologic disorder: Seizures or psychosis; sensitivity = 20%; specificity = 98%.

Other than the ACR criteria, people with lupus may also have:

- Fever (over 100 °F/ 37.7 °C)
- Extreme fatigue
- Hair loss
- Fingers turning white or blue when cold (Raynaud syndrome)

==== Criteria for individual diagnosis ====
Some people, especially those with antiphospholipid syndrome, may have SLE without four of the above criteria, and also SLE may present with features other than those listed in the criteria.

Recursive partitioning has been used to identify more parsimonious criteria. This analysis presented two diagnostic classification trees:

1. Simplest classification tree: SLE is diagnosed if a person has an immunologic disorder (anti-DNA antibody, anti-Smith antibody, false positive syphilis test, or LE cells) or malar rash. It has sensitivity = 92% and specificity = 92%.
2. Full classification tree: Uses six criteria. It has sensitivity = 97% and specificity = 95%.

Other diagonistic criteria have been suggested, such as the St. Thomas' Hospital "alternative" criteria in 1998.

== Treatment ==
There is no cure for lupus. The treatment of SLE involves preventing flares and reducing their severity and duration when they occur.

Hydroxychloroquine was approved by the Food and Drug Administration (FDA) for lupus in 1955. Hydroxychloroquine is a first line agent for SLE and is associated with reduced mortality, complications, and disease activity. Hydroxychloroquine is associated with a 54% reduction in mortality due to SLE. It is recommended that all people with SLE be on hydroxychloroquine regardless of disease activity due to its well documented benefits, unless there are contraindications to its use. Contraindications to hydroxychloroquine include allergy to the medication or significant retinal disease (as hydroxychloroquine may worsen retinopathy). Regular eye exams are recommended for those on hydroxychloroquine chronically due to this rare risk. The prevalence of retinal toxicity for those on the medication was 2% at 10 years.

Treatment can include corticosteroids and anti-malarial drugs. Certain types of lupus nephritis such as diffuse proliferative glomerulonephritis require intermittent cytotoxic drugs. These drugs include cyclophosphamide and mycophenolate. Cyclophosphamide increases the risk of developing infections, pancreas problems, high blood sugar, and high blood pressure.

Some drugs approved for other diseases are used for SLE "off-label". In November 2010, an FDA advisory panel recommended approving belimumab (Benlysta) as a treatment for the pain and flare-ups common in lupus. The drug was approved by the FDA in March 2011.

In terms of healthcare utilization and costs, one study found that "patients from the US with SLE, especially individuals with moderate or severe disease, utilize significant healthcare resources and incur high medical costs."

=== Medications ===
Due to the variety of symptoms and organ system involvement with SLE, its severity in an individual must be assessed to successfully treat SLE. Mild or remittent disease may, sometimes, be safely left untreated. If required, nonsteroidal anti-inflammatory drugs and antimalarials may be used. Medications such as prednisone, mycophenolic acid and tacrolimus have been used in the past.

==== Disease-modifying antirheumatic drugs ====
Disease-modifying antirheumatic drugs (DMARDs) are used preventively to reduce the incidence of flares, the progress of the disease, and the need for steroid use; when flares occur, they are treated with corticosteroids. DMARDs commonly in use are antimalarials such as hydroxychloroquine and immunosuppressants (e.g. methotrexate and azathioprine). Hydroxychloroquine is an FDA-approved antimalarial used for constitutional, cutaneous, and articular manifestations. Hydroxychloroquine has relatively few side effects, and there is evidence that it improves survival among people who have SLE. Cyclophosphamide is used for severe glomerulonephritis or other organ-damaging complications. Mycophenolic acid is also used for the treatment of lupus nephritis, but it is not FDA-approved for this indication, and FDA is investigating reports that it may be associated with birth defects when used by pregnant women. A study involving more than 1,000 people with lupus found that people have a similar risk of serious infection with azathioprine and mycophenolic acid as with newer biological therapies (rituximab and belimumab).

==== Immunosuppressive drugs ====
In more severe cases, medications that modulate the immune system (primarily corticosteroids and immunosuppressants) are used to control the disease and prevent recurrence of symptoms (known as flares). Depending on the dosage, people who require steroids may develop Cushing's syndrome, symptoms of which may include obesity, puffy round face, diabetes mellitus, increased appetite, difficulty sleeping, and osteoporosis. These may subside if and when the large initial dosage is reduced, but long-term use of even low doses can cause elevated blood pressure and cataracts.

Numerous new immunosuppressive drugs are being actively tested for SLE. Rather than broadly suppressing the immune system, as corticosteroids do, they target the responses of specific types of immune cells. Some of these drugs are already FDA-approved for treatment of rheumatoid arthritis; however, due to high-toxicity, their use remains limited.

==== Analgesia ====
Since a large percentage of people with SLE have varying amounts of chronic pain, stronger prescription analgesics (painkillers) may be used if over-the-counter drugs (mainly nonsteroidal anti-inflammatory drugs) do not provide effective relief. Potent NSAIDs such as indomethacin and diclofenac are relatively contraindicated for people with SLE because they increase the risk of kidney failure and heart failure.

Pain is typically treated with opioids, varying in potency based on the severity of symptoms. When opioids are used for prolonged periods, drug tolerance, chemical dependency, and addiction may occur. Opiate addiction is not typically a concern since the condition is not likely to ever completely disappear. Thus, lifelong treatment with opioids is fairly common for chronic pain symptoms, accompanied by periodic titration that is typical of any long-term opioid regimen.

==== Intravenous immunoglobulins (IVIGs) ====
Intravenous immunoglobulins may be used to control SLE with organ involvement, or vasculitis. It is believed that they reduce antibody production or promote the clearance of immune complexes from the body, even though their mechanism of action is not well understood. Unlike immunosuppressives and corticosteroids, IVIGs do not suppress the immune system, so there is less risk of serious infections with these drugs.

=== Lifestyle changes ===
Avoiding sunlight in SLE is critical since ultraviolet radiation is known to exacerbate skin manifestations of the disease. Avoiding activities that induce fatigue is also important since those with SLE fatigue easily and it can be debilitating. These two problems can lead to people becoming housebound for long periods of time. Physical exercise has been shown to help improve fatigue in adults with SLE. Drugs unrelated to SLE should be prescribed only when known not to exacerbate the disease. Occupational exposure to silica, pesticides, and mercury can also worsen the disease. Recommendations for evidence based non-pharmacological interventions in the management of SLE have been developed by an international task force of clinicians and patients with SLE.

=== Kidney transplantation ===
Kidney transplants are the treatment of choice for end-stage kidney disease, which is one of the complications of lupus nephritis, but the recurrence of the full disease is common in up to 30% of people.

=== Antiphospholipid syndrome ===
Approximately 20% of people with SLE have clinically significant levels of antiphospholipid antibodies, which are associated with antiphospholipid syndrome. Antiphospholipid syndrome is also related to the onset of neural lupus symptoms in the brain. In this form of the disease, the cause is very different from lupus: thromboses (blood clots or "sticky blood") form in blood vessels, which prove to be fatal if they move within the bloodstream. If the thromboses migrate to the brain, they can potentially cause a stroke by blocking the blood supply to the brain.

If this disorder is suspected in people, brain scans are usually required for early detection. These scans can show localized areas of the brain where blood supply has not been adequate. The treatment plan for these people requires anticoagulation. Often, low-dose aspirin is prescribed for this purpose, although for cases involving thrombosis anticoagulants such as warfarin are used.

=== Management of pregnancy ===
While most infants born to mothers who have SLE are healthy, pregnant mothers with SLE should remain under medical care until delivery. However, SLE in the pregnant mother poses a higher risk of neonatal lupus, intrauterine growth restriction, preterm membrane rupture, preterm birth, and miscarriage. Neonatal lupus is rare, but identification of mothers at the highest risk for complications allows for prompt treatment before or after birth. In addition, SLE can flare up during pregnancy, and proper treatment can maintain the health of the mother longer. Women pregnant and known to have anti-Ro (SSA) or anti-La antibodies (SSB) often have echocardiograms during the 16th and 30th weeks of pregnancy to monitor the health of the heart and surrounding vasculature.

Contraception and other reliable forms of pregnancy prevention are routinely advised for women with SLE since getting pregnant during active disease was found to be harmful. Lupus nephritis, gestational diabetes, and pre-eclampsia are common manifestations.

== Prognosis ==
No cure is available for SLE but there are many treatments for the disease.

In the 1950s, most people diagnosed with SLE lived fewer than five years. Today, over 90% now survive for more than ten years, and many live relatively symptom-free. Eighty to ninety percent can expect to live a normal lifespan. Mortality rates are, however, elevated compared to people without SLE.

Prognosis is typically worse for men and children than for women; however, if symptoms are present after age 60, the disease tends to run a more benign course. Early mortality (within five years) is due to organ failure or overwhelming infections, both of which can be altered by early diagnosis and treatment. The mortality risk for those with SLE is multiplied fivefold when compared to the normal population in late stages of the disease, which can be attributed to cardiovascular disease from accelerated atherosclerosis, the leading cause of death for people with SLE. To reduce the potential for cardiovascular issues, high blood pressure and high cholesterol should be prevented or treated aggressively. Steroids should be used at the lowest dose for the shortest possible period, and other drugs that can reduce symptoms should be used whenever possible.

== Epidemiology ==
The global rates of SLE are approximately 20–70 per 100,000 people. In females, the rate is highest between 45 and 64 years of age. The lowest overall rate exists in Iceland and Japan. The highest rates exist in the US and France. However, there is not sufficient evidence to conclude why SLE is less common in some countries compared to others; it could be the environmental variability in these countries. For example, different countries receive different levels of sunlight, and exposure to UV rays affects dermatological symptoms of SLE.

Certain studies hypothesize that a genetic connection exists between race and lupus which affects disease prevalence. If this is true, the racial composition of countries affects disease and will cause the incidence in a country to change as the racial makeup changes. To understand if this is true, countries with largely homogenous and racially stable populations should be studied to better understand incidence. Rates of disease in the developing world are unclear.

The rate of SLE varies between countries, ethnicity, and sex, and changes over time. In the United States, one estimate of the rate of SLE is 53 per 100,000; another estimate places the total affected population at 322,000 to over 1 million (98 to over 305 per 100,000). In Northern Europe the rate is about 40 per 100,000 people. SLE occurs more frequently and with greater severity among those of non-European descent. That rate has been found to be as high as 159 per 100,000 among those of Afro-Caribbean descent. Childhood-onset systemic lupus erythematosus generally presents between the ages of 3 and 15 and is four times more common in girls.

While the onset and persistence of SLE can show disparities between genders, socioeconomic status also plays a major role. Women with SLE and of lower socioeconomic status have been shown to have higher depression scores, higher body mass index, and more restricted access to medical care than women of higher socioeconomic statuses with the illness. People with SLE had more self-reported anxiety and depression scores if they were from a lower socioeconomic status.

=== Race ===
There are assertions that race affects the rate of SLE. However, a 2010 review of studies that correlate race and SLE identified several sources of systematic and methodological error, indicating that the connection between race and SLE may be spurious. For example, studies show that social support is a modulating factor which buffers against SLE-related damage and maintains physiological functionality. Studies have not been conducted to determine whether people of different racial backgrounds receive differing levels of social support. If there is a difference, this could act as a confounding variable in studies correlating race and SLE.

Another caveat to note when examining studies about SLE is that symptoms are often self-reported. This process introduces additional sources of methodological error. Studies have shown that self-reported data is affected by more than just the patient's experience with the disease- social support, the level of helplessness, and abnormal illness-related behaviors also factor into a self-assessment. Additionally, other factors like the degree of social support that a person receives, socioeconomic status, health insurance, and access to care can contribute to an individual's disease progression.

Racial differences in lupus progression have not been found in studies that control for the socioeconomic status (SES) of participants. Studies that control for the SES of its participants have found that non-white people have more abrupt disease onset compared to white people and that their lupus progresses more quickly. Non-white patients often report more hematological, serosal, neurological, and renal symptoms. However, the severity of both symptoms and mortality are similar in white and non-white patients. Studies that report different rates of disease progression in late-stage SLE are most likely reflecting differences in socioeconomic status and corresponding differences in access to care. The people who receive medical care have often accrued less disease-related damage and are less likely to be below the poverty line. Additional studies have found that education, marital status, occupation, and income create a social context that affects disease progression.

=== Sex ===
SLE, like many autoimmune diseases, affects females more frequently than males, at a rate of about 9 to 1.

Hormonal mechanisms could explain the increased incidence of SLE in females. The onset of SLE could be attributed to the elevated hydroxylation of estrogen and the abnormally decreased levels of androgens in females. In addition, differences in GnRH signalling have also been shown to contribute to the onset of SLE. While females are more likely to relapse than males, the intensity of these relapses is the same for both sexes.

In addition to hormonal mechanisms, specific genetic influences found on the X chromosome may also contribute to the development of SLE. The X chromosome carries immunologic genes like CD40L, which can mutate or simply escape silencing by X-chromosome inactivation and contribute to the onset of SLE. A study has shown an association between Klinefelter syndrome and SLE. XXY males with SLE have an abnormal X–Y translocation resulting in the partial triplication of the PAR1 gene region. Research has also implicated XIST, which encodes a long non-coding RNA that coats the inactive member of the pair of X chromosomes in females as part of a ribonucleoprotein complex, as a source of autoimmunity.

=== Changing rate of disease ===
The rate of SLE in the United States increased from 1.0 in 1955 to 7.6 in 1974. Whether the increase is due to better diagnosis or an increased frequency of the disease is unknown.

== History ==
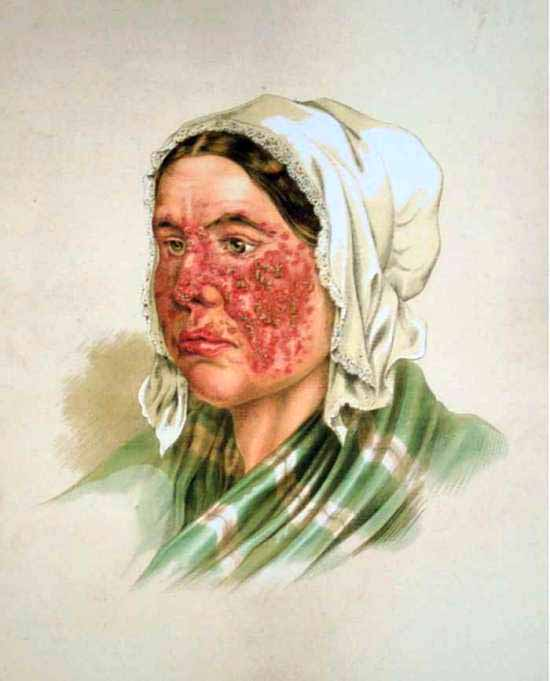
A historical drawing of lupus erythematosus, once considered a non-fatal disfiguring skin disease

The history of SLE can be divided into three periods: classical, neoclassical, and modern. In each period, research and documentation advanced the understanding and diagnosis of SLE, leading to its classification as an autoimmune disease in 1851, and to the various diagnostic options and treatments now available to people with SLE. The advances made by medical science in the diagnosis and treatment of SLE have dramatically improved the life expectancy of a person diagnosed with SLE.

=== Etymology ===
There are several explanations ventured for the term lupus erythematosus. Lupus is Latin for "wolf", and in Medieval Latin was also used to refer to a disease of the skin. Erythematosus is derived from the word ἐρύθημα (erythema), Ancient Greek for "redness of the skin". All explanations originate with the reddish, butterfly-shaped malar rash that the disease classically exhibits across the nose and cheeks. Many diseases that caused ulceration or necrosis were given the term "lupus" due to the wound being reminiscent of a wolf's bite. For example, lupus vulgaris, or chronic facial tuberculosis, though not related to lupus erythematosus, is also characterized by lesions which are ragged and punched out and are said to resemble the bite of a wolf.

=== Classical period ===
Lupus was first recognized in the Middle Ages. The use of the term lupus in a context similar to its modern use is attributed to 12th-century Italian physician Rogerius Frugard, who used it to describe ulcerating sores on the legs. No formal treatment for the disease existed and the resources available to physicians to help people were limited.

=== Neoclassical period ===
In 1851, the skin disease which is now known as discoid lupus was documented by the French physician Pierre Cazenave. Cazenave termed the illness lupus and added the word erythematosus to distinguish this disease from other illnesses that affected the skin, but unlike lupus erythematosus were infectious. Cazenave observed the disease in several people and made very detailed notes to assist others in its diagnosis. He was one of the first to document that lupus affected adults from adolescence into the early thirties and that a facial rash is its most distinguishing feature.

Research and documentation of the disease continued in the neoclassical period with the work of Ferdinand von Hebra and his son-in-law, Moritz Kaposi. They documented the physical effects of lupus and made some insights into the possibility that the disease caused internal trauma. Von Hebra observed that lupus symptoms could last many years and that the disease could go "dormant" after years of aggressive activity and then re-appear with symptoms following the same general pattern. These observations led Hebra to term lupus a chronic disease in 1872.

Kaposi observed that lupus assumed two forms: the classic skin lesions (now known as discoid lupus) and a more aggravated form that affected not only the skin but also caused fever, arthritis, and other systemic disorders. The latter also presented a rash confined to the face, appearing on the cheeks and across the bridge of the nose; he called this the "butterfly rash". Kaposi also observed those patients who developed the butterfly rash were often afflicted with another disease, such as tuberculosis, anemia, or chlorisis, which often caused death. Kaposi was one of the first people to recognize what is now termed systemic lupus erythematosus in his documentation of the remitting and relapsing nature of the disease and the relationship of skin and systemic manifestations during disease activity.

19th century research into lupus continued with the work of Sir William Osler who, in 1895, published the first of his three papers about the internal complications of erythema exudativum multiforme. Not all the patient cases in his paper had SLE but Osler's work expanded the knowledge of systemic diseases and documented extensive and critical visceral complications for several diseases including lupus. Noting that many people with lupus had a disease that not only affected the skin but many other organs in the body as well, Osler added the word "systemic" to the term lupus erythematosus to distinguish this type of disease from discoid lupus erythematosus.

Osler's second paper noted that reoccurrence is a special feature of the disease and that attacks can be sustained for months or even years. Further study of the disease led to a third paper, published in 1903, documenting afflictions such as arthritis, pneumonia, the inability to form coherent ideas, delirium, and central nervous system damage as all affecting patients diagnosed with SLE.

=== Modern period ===
Beginning in 1920, major developments in research into the cause and treatment of discoid and systemic lupus were made. Research conducted in the 1920s and 1930s led to the first detailed pathologic descriptions of lupus and demonstrated how the disease affected the kidney, heart, and lung tissue. A breakthrough was made in 1948 with the discovery of the LE cell (the lupus erythematosus cell—a misnomer, as it occurs with other diseases as well). Discovered by a team of researchers at the Mayo Clinic, they discovered that the white blood cells contained the nucleus of another cell that was pushing against the white cell's proper nucleus.

Noting that the invading nucleus was coated with antibody that allowed it to be ingested by a phagocytic or scavenger cell, they named the antibody that causes one cell to ingest another the LE factor and the two nuclei cell result in the LE cell. The LE cell, it was determined, was a part of an anti-nuclear antibody (ANA) reaction; the body produces antibodies against its own tissue. This discovery led to one of the first definitive tests for lupus since LE cells are found in approximately 60% of all people diagnosed with lupus. The LE cell test is rarely performed as a definitive lupus test today as LE cells do not always occur in people with SLE and can occur in individuals with other autoimmune diseases. Their presence can help establish a diagnosis but no longer indicates a definitive SLE diagnosis.

The discovery of the LE cell led to further research that resulted in more definitive tests for lupus. Building on the knowledge that those with SLE had auto-antibodies that would attach themselves to the nuclei of normal cells, causing the immune system to send white blood cells to fight off these "invaders", a test was developed to look for the anti-nuclear antibody (ANA) rather than the LE cell specifically. This ANA test was easier to perform and led not only to a definitive diagnosis of lupus but also many other related diseases. This discovery led to the understanding of what is now known as autoimmune diseases.

To ensure that the person has lupus and not another autoimmune disease, the American College of Rheumatology (ACR) established a list of clinical and immunologic criteria that, in any combination, point to SLE. The criteria include symptoms that the person can identify (e.g. pain) and things that a physician can detect in a physical examination and through laboratory test results. The list was originally compiled in 1971, initially revised in 1982, and further revised and improved in 2009.

Medical historians have theorized that people with porphyria (a disease that shares many symptoms with SLE) generated folklore stories of vampires and werewolves, due to the photosensitivity, scarring, hair growth, and porphyrin brownish-red stained teeth in severe recessive forms of porphyria (or combinations of the disorder, known as dual, homozygous, or compound heterozygous porphyrias).

Useful medication for the disease was first found in 1894 when quinine was first reported as an effective therapy. Four years later, the use of salicylates in conjunction with quinine was noted to be of still greater benefit. This was the best available treatment until the middle of the twentieth century when Hench discovered the efficacy of corticosteroids in the treatment of SLE.

== Research ==
A study called BLISS-76 tested the drug belimumab, a fully human monoclonal anti-BAFF (or anti-BLyS) antibody. BAFF stimulates and extends the life of B lymphocytes, which produce antibodies against foreign and self-protein. It was approved by the FDA in March 2011. Genetically engineered immune cells are also being studied in animal models of the disease as of 2019.

In September 2022, researchers at the University of Erlangen-Nuremberg published promising results using genetically altered immune cells to treat severely ill patients. Four women and one man received transfusions of CAR T cells modified to attack their B cells, eliminating the aberrant ones. The therapy drove the disease into remission in all five patients, who remained disease-free off lupus medication for several months after the treatment ended.

== Famous cases ==
- Shannon Boxx, U.S. Olympic team soccer player
- Nick Cannon, American television host, actor, rapper, and comedian
- Pumpuang Duangjan, Thai Luk Thung singer. Many Thai people know lupus as "Phumpuang disease", as the disease caused her death.
- Selena Gomez, singer, actress, producer, and businesswoman
- Sally Hawkins, actress
- Flannery O'Connor, Southern Gothic novelist and short story author
- Michael Jackson, American singer, songwriter, dancer and philanthropist
- Seal, British singer
- Toni Braxton, American singer, songwriter, actress and television personality

== See also ==
- Childhood-onset systemic lupus erythematosus
- Canine discoid lupus erythematosus
- List of people with lupus
- Dazukibart
