= Cutaneous lupus mucinosis =

- Other names: Papular and nodular mucinosis in lupus erythematosus, papular and nodular mucinosis of Gold, and papulonodular mucinosis in lupus erythematosus
- Specialty: Dermatology

Cutaneous lupus mucinosis, also known as papular and nodular mucinosis in lupus erythematosus, papular and nodular mucinosis of Gold, and papulonodular mucinosis in lupus erythematosus, is a cutaneous condition characterized by lesions that present as asymptomatic skin-colored, at times reddish, 0.5–2 cm papules and nodules.

== See also ==
- Papular mucinosis
- List of cutaneous conditions
