= Discoid lupus erythematosus =

Autoimmune skin condition

- Other names: DLE, Discoid lupus
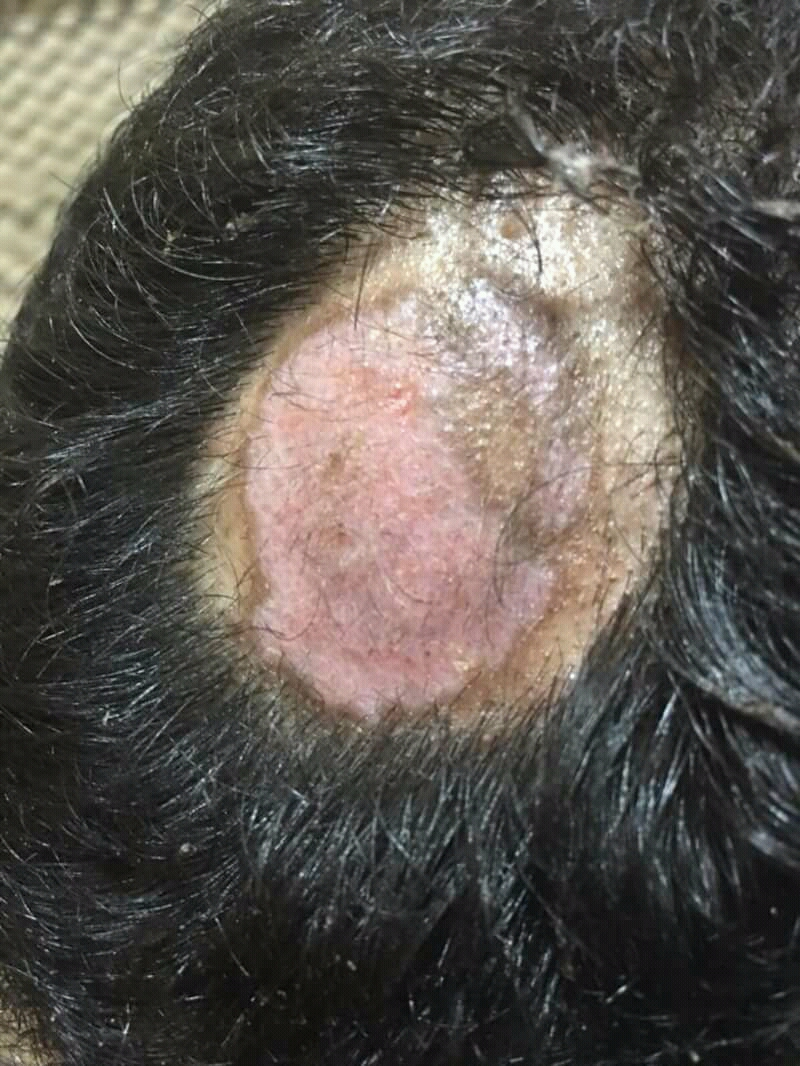
- Discoid lupus erythematosus lesion on the head
- Specialty: Dermatology, Immunology

Discoid lupus erythematosus is the most common type of chronic cutaneous lupus (CCLE), an autoimmune skin condition on the lupus erythematosus spectrum of illnesses. It presents with red, painful, inflamed and coin-shaped patches of skin with a scaly and crusty appearance, most often on the scalp, cheeks, and ears. Hair loss may occur if the lesions are on the scalp. The lesions can then develop severe scarring, and the centre areas may appear lighter in color with a rim darker than the normal skin. These lesions can last for years without treatment.

Patients with systemic lupus erythematosus develop discoid lupus lesions with some frequency. However, patients who present initially with discoid lupus infrequently develop systemic lupus. Discoid lupus can be divided into localized, generalized, and childhood discoid lupus.

The lesions are diagnosed by biopsy. Patients are first treated with sunscreen and topical steroids. If this does not work, an oral medication—most likely hydroxychloroquine or a related medication—can be tried.

== Signs and symptoms ==
=== Morphology of lesions ===
Discoid lupus erythematosus (DLE) skin lesions first present as dull or purplish red, disc-shaped flat or raised and firm areas of skin. These lesions then develop increasing amounts of white, adherent scale. Finally, the lesions develop extensive scarring and/or atrophy, as well as pigment changes. They may also have overlying dried fluid, known as crust. On darker skin, the lesions often lose skin pigmentation in the center and develop increased, dark skin pigmentation around the rim. On lighter skin, the lesions often develop a gray color or have very little color change. More rarely, the lesions may be bright red and look like hives.

=== Location of lesions ===
The skin lesions are most often in sun-exposed areas localized above the neck, with favored sites being the scalp, bridge of the nose, upper cheeks, lower lip, and ear and hands and fingers 24% of patients also have lesions in the mouth (most often the palate), nose, eye, or vulva, which are all mucosal parts of the body.

More rarely, patients may have lesions on the head and neck as well as the arms and trunk.

=== Special characteristics of some lesions ===
==== Scalp lesions ====
When discoid lupus is on the scalp, it starts as a red flat or raised area of skin that then loses hair and develops extensive scarring. The lesions often lose skin pigment and become white with areas of increased skin pigment, with or without areas of redness, and have a sunken appearance. They can have a smooth surface or have visible, dilated hair follicles on the surface.

==== Lip lesions ====
When discoid lupus is on the lip, it often has a grey or red colour with a thickened top layer of skin (known as hyperkeratosis), areas where the top layer has worn away (known as erosion), and a surrounding rim of redness.

=== Other symptoms ===
Patients may state that their lesions are itchy, tender, or asymptomatic. In addition to their skin lesions, they may also have swelling and redness around their eyes, as well as blepharitis.

=== Complications ===
Darker-skinned patients are often left with severe scarring and skin color changes even after the lesions get better. In addition, these patients have an increased, though still small, risk for aggressive skin squamous cell carcinoma.

== Causes ==
Sun exposure triggers lesions in people with discoid lupus erythematous (DLE). Evidence does not clearly demonstrate a genetic component to DLE; however, genetics may predispose certain people to disease.

== Mechanism ==
Most experts consider DLE an autoimmune disease since pathologists see antibodies when they biopsy the lesions and look at the tissue under the microscope. However, scientists do not understand the connection between these antibodies and the lesions seen in discoid lupus.

Possibly, UV light damages skin cells, which then release material from their nuclei. This material diffuses to the dermoepidermal junction, where it binds to circulating antibodies, thereby leading to a series of inflammatory reactions by the immune system.

Alternatively, dysfunctional T cells may lead to the disease.

== Diagnosis ==
When a patient initially presents with discoid lupus, the doctor should ensure that the patient does not have systemic lupus erythematosus. The doctor will order tests to check for anti-nuclear antibodies in the patient's serum, low white blood cell levels, and protein and/or blood in the urine.

In order to help with diagnosis, the doctor may peel off the top layer of scale from a patient's lesions in order to look at its underside. If the patients do indeed have discoid lupus, the doctor may see tiny spines of keratin that look like carpet tacks and are called langue au chat.

Diagnosis is confirmed through biopsy. Typical biopsy findings include deposits of IgG and IgM antibodies at the dermoepidermal junction on direct immunofluorescence. This finding is 90% sensitive; however, false positives can occur with biopsies of facial lesions. In addition, pathologists often see groups of white blood cells, particularly T helper cells, around the follicles and blood vessels in the dermis. The epidermis appears thin and has effaced rete ridges as well as excess amounts of keratin clogging the openings of the follicles. The basal layer of the epidermis sometimes appears to have holes in it since some of the cells in this layer have broken apart. The remains of skin cells that have died through a process called apoptosis are visible in the upper layer of the dermis and the basal layer of the epidermis.

The differential diagnosis includes actinic keratoses, sebborheic dermatitis, lupus vulgaris, sarcoidosis, drug rash, Bowen's disease, lichen planus, tertiary syphilis, polymorphous light eruption, lymphocytic infiltration, psoriasis, and systemic lupus erythematosus.

=== Classification ===
Discoid lupus can be broadly classified into localized discoid lupus and generalized discoid lupus based on the location of the lesions. Patients who develop discoid lupus in childhood also have their own sub-type of disease.

Hypertrophic lupus and lupus profundus are two special types of discoid lupus distinguished by their characteristic morphological findings.

Finally, many patients with systemic lupus also develop discoid lupus lesions.

==== Localized ====
Most people with discoid lupus only have lesions above the neck and therefore have localized discoid lupus erythematosus.

==== Generalized ====
Rarely, patients may have lesions above and below the neck; these patients have generalized discoid lupus erythematosus. In addition to lesions in the typical above-the-neck locations, patients with generalized discoid lupus often have lesions on the thorax and the arms. These patients are often bald, with abnormal skin pigment on their scalp, and have severe scarring of the face and arms. Patients with generalized discoid lupus often have abnormal lab tests, such as an elevated ESR or a low white blood cell count. They also often have auto-antibodies, such as ANA or anti-ssDNA antibody.

==== Childhood ====
When patients develop discoid lupus in childhood, it differs from typical discoid lupus in several ways. Boys and girls are equally affected, and these patients later develop SLE more often. These patients also typically do not have any abnormal sensitivity to the sun.

==== Special types of discoid lupus lesions ====
===== Hypertrophic lupus =====
Some experts consider hypertrophic lupus erythematosus—which consists of lesions covered by a very thick, keratin-filled scale—an unusual subset of discoid lupus. Others consider it a distinct entity.

===== Lupus profundus =====
If a patient has discoid lupus lesions on top of lupus panniculitis, they have lupus profundus. These patients have firm, nontender nodules with defined borders underneath their discoid lupus lesions.

==== Systemic lupus erythematosus with discoid lupus lesions ====
In general, patients with discoid lupus who have only skin disease and no systemic symptoms have a genetically distinct disease from patients with SLE. However, 25% of patients with SLE get discoid lupus lesions at some point as part of their disease.

== Treatment ==
Treatment for discoid lupus erythematosus includes smoking cessation and a sunscreen that protects against both UVA and UVB light as well as very strong topical steroids or steroids injected into the lesions. Other topical treatments, tacrolimus or pimecrolimus can also be used. If this does not help the patient, his or her physician can prescribe an antimalarial medication such as oral hydroxychloroquine or chloroquine. Other oral medications used to treat discoid lupus include retinoids (isotretinoin or acitretin), dapsone, thalidomide (teratogenic, side effects include peripheral neuropathy), azathioprine, methotrexate, or gold. The topical steroid fluocinonide is more effective than hydrocortisone in the treatment of discoid lupus erythematosus. For oral treatment, hydroxychloroquine and acitretin are equally effective; however, acitretin was associated with more adverse effects.

Pulsed dye laser is also an effective treatment for patients with localized discoid lupus. For patients with scalp disease, hair transplantation can help with their hair loss.

== Prognosis ==
Discoid lupus erythematosus is a chronic condition, and lesions will last for several years without treatment. 50% of patients will eventually get better on their own. If a patient does not have any signs of systemic lupus erythematosus, such as generalized hair loss, ulcers in the mouth or nose, Raynaud's phenomenon, arthritis, or fever at the time that they develop discoid lupus, they will most likely only have discoid lupus and will never develop systemic lupus erythematosus.

== Epidemiology ==
Discoid lupus has an unknown incidence, although it is two to three times more common than systemic lupus erythematosus. The disease tends to affect young adults, and women are affected more than men in a 2:1 ratio.

== Society and culture ==
The musician Seal has this skin condition.

Singer Michael Jackson was reportedly diagnosed with discoid lupus in 1984; the condition might have damaged his nasal cartilage and led to some of his cosmetic surgery.

== In animals ==
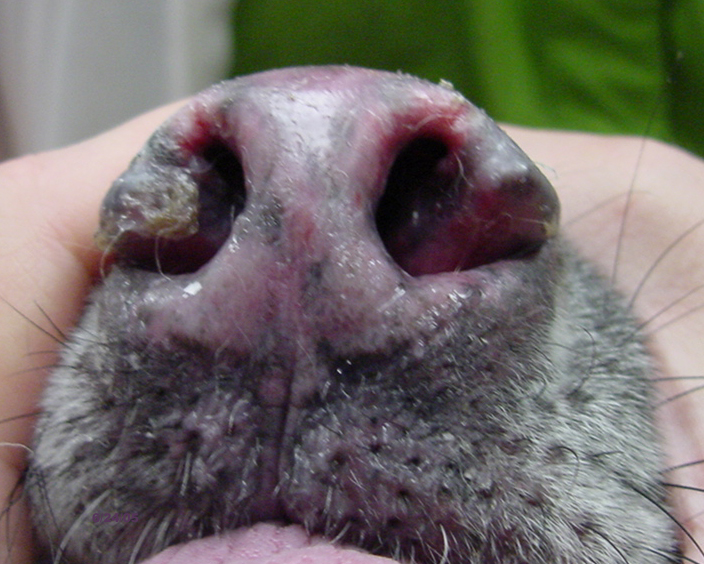
A dog with a lesion on the nose

Dogs and horses can also get discoid lupus. In dogs, German Shepherds are among the most commonly affected breeds: in a review of published cases, 32 of 104 dogs (31%) with the classic facial form were German Shepherds or their crosses, as were 17 of 36 dogs (47%) with the related mucocutaneous form, which causes erosions around the anus and genitals.

== See also ==
- List of cutaneous conditions associated with increased risk of nonmelanoma skin cancer
- List of people with lupus
