= Malar rash =

Red, scaly rash of the cheeks and bridge of the nose

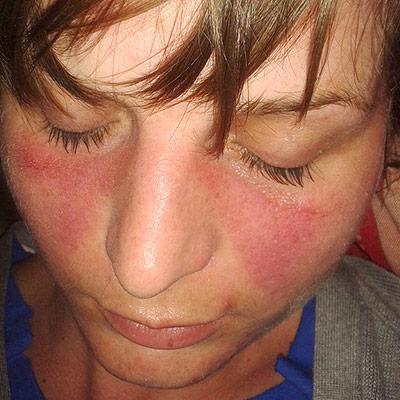
- A malar rash, or "butterfly rash", is characteristically red or purplish and mildly scaly (seen in patients with systemic lupus erythematosus).

A malar rash (from Latin mala 'jaw, cheek-bone'), also called butterfly rash, is a medical sign consisting of a characteristic form of facial rash. It is often seen in lupus erythematosus. More rarely, it is also seen in other diseases, such as pellagra, dermatomyositis, and Bloom syndrome.

Many conditions can cause rashes with a similar appearance to a malar rash. A malar rash is present in approximately 46–65% of people with lupus.

== Definition ==
A malar rash of lupus is red or purplish and mildly scaly. It has the characteristic shape of a butterfly, and involves the bridge of the nose. Notably, the rash spares the nasolabial folds of the face, which contributes to its characteristic appearance. It is usually macular with sharp edges, and not itchy. The rash can be transient or progressive with involvement of other parts of the facial skin.

While some literature has described the slapped-cheek rash of fifth disease as a malar rash, it differs slightly in that the nose is typically spared.

== Differential diagnosis ==
Conditions that can cause rashes with a similar appearance to a malar rash include:

- lupus erythematosus
- pellagra
- dermatomyositis
- Bloom syndrome
- Rosacea, a long-term skin condition characterized by a red rash, usually on the face.

Lupus causes up to 96% of all cases of malar rash. Where lupus is suspected, further medical tests and a detailed history and examination are necessary to differentiate it from other conditions. These tests may include a test for the presence of anti-nuclear antibody in the blood as a screening test, which is not specific for lupus erythematosus.

== Epidemiology ==
A malar rash is present in approximately 46–65% of people with lupus, with an average of 57% of lupus patients having it across all populations. This percentage varies between different populations.

== History ==
A malar rash is often known more colloquially as a butterfly rash due to its distinctive appearance.

== See also ==
- Malar flush
