= Verrucous lupus erythematosus =

- Other names: Hypertrophic lupus erythematosus
- Specialty: Dermatology

Verrucous lupus erythematosus presents with non-pruritic papulonodular lesions on the arms and hands, resembling keratoacanthoma or hypertrophic lichen planus.

== See also ==
- Lupus erythematosus
