= Subacute cutaneous lupus erythematosus =

- Other names: SCLE
- Specialty: Dermatology
- Frequency: 0.005%

Subacute cutaneous lupus erythematosus

Subacute cutaneous lupus erythematosus (SCLE ) is a clinically distinct subset of cases of lupus erythematosus that is most often present in white women aged 15 to 40, consisting of skin lesions that are scaly and evolve as poly-cyclic annular lesions or plaques similar to those of plaque psoriasis.

Characteristically the lesions appear in sun-exposed areas such as the vee of the neckline or the forearms, but not the face. It may be brought on by sun-sensitizing medications, but is usually associated with autoimmune disorders such as rheumatoid arthritis and Sjögren's syndrome.

Therapy generally involves sun avoidance and protection and topical corticosteroids. Sometimes systemic drug treatment is necessary. Besides corticosteroids other immunosuppressants such as methotrexate are also used.

Lesions of SCLE may have an annular (shaped like a ring) configuration, with raised red borders and central clearing.

== Signs and symptoms ==
The lesions of systemic lupus erythematosus are characterized by their distribution, which can be either annular with central clearing or papulosquamous. The lesions normally heal without atrophy or scarring, and these two forms can happen at the same time. While telangiectasia or hypopigmentation may occur, most patients' skin returns to normal. Serologic abnormalities, musculoskeletal complaints, and mild illness are common in patients with SCLE. SCLE typically avoids the face and is more common in sun-exposed areas such as the neck, shoulders, chest, and extensor surfaces of the arms.

== Causes ==
The etiology of systemic lupus erythematosus is not well understood. Sunlight exposure is the traditional precipitating factor in patients with immune dysregulation and an aberrant milieu of genetic predisposition. There have also been reports of drug-induced SCLE. Angiotensin-converting enzyme inhibitors, anticonvulsants, beta-blockers, and immune modulators, such as TNF alpha inhibitors, are frequently used medications that have been linked to SCLE. Case reports of SCLE developing in cancers have been published.

== Diagnosis ==
Like other forms of lupus erythematosus, systemic lupus erythematosus is primarily diagnosed clinically based on clinical features. When there is doubt about the diagnosis, a skin biopsy combined with a confirmatory histopathologic examination is recommended. Anti-SSA/Ro and anti-SSB/La laboratory studies are also recommended. In cases where histopathology is unclear, direct immunofluorescence can be utilized to help confirm the diagnosis. At the dermal-epidermal junction, immunofluorescence reveals a granular pattern of immunoglobulin deposition.

== See also ==
- Lupus erythematosus
- List of cutaneous conditions
- List of human leukocyte antigen alleles associated with cutaneous conditions
