= Obstetrics =

Medical specialty concerning pregnancy and childbirth

Obstetrician
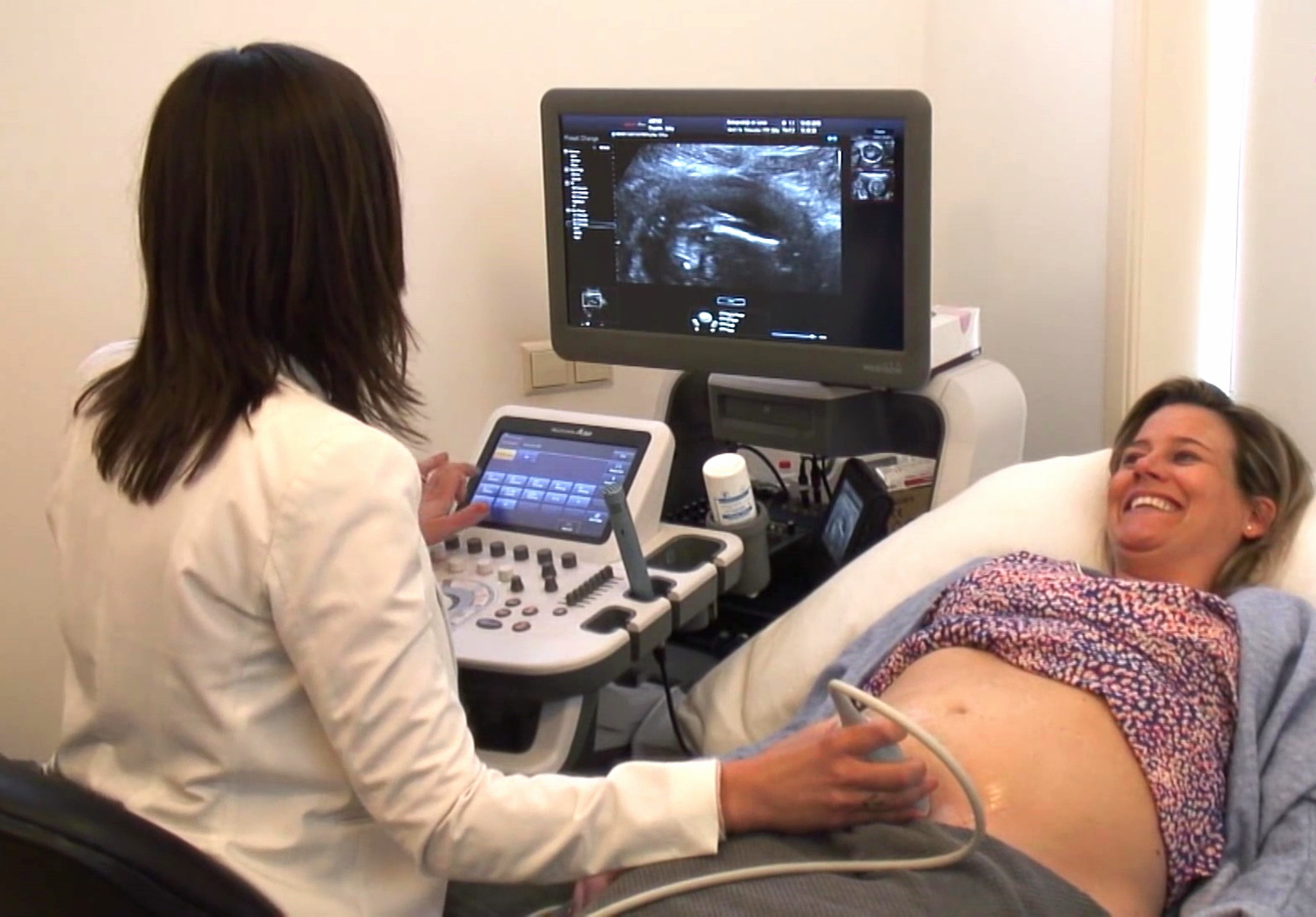

Occupation
- Names: Physician; Surgeon
- Occupation type: Specialty
- Activity sectors: Medicine, surgery

Description
- Education required: Doctor of Medicine (M.D.); Doctor of Osteopathic medicine (D.O.); Bachelor of Medicine, Bachelor of Surgery (M.B.B.S.); Bachelor of Medicine, Bachelor of Surgery (MBChB)
- Fields of employment: Hospitals, clinics

Obstetrics is the field of study concentrated on pregnancy, childbirth and the postpartum period. As a medical specialty, obstetrics is - in some jurisdictions - combined with gynecology under the discipline known as obstetrics and gynecology (OB-GYN), which is a surgical field.

== Main areas ==
=== Prenatal care ===
Prenatal care is important in screening for various complications of pregnancy. This includes routine office visits with physical exams and routine lab tests along with telehealth care for women with low-risk pregnancies:

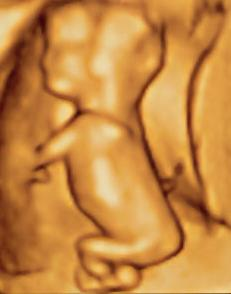
3D ultrasound of 75-millimetre (3.0 in) fetus (about 14 weeks gestational age)

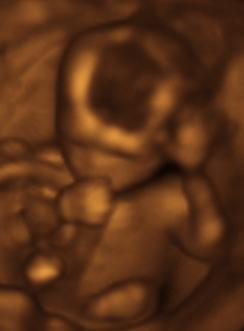
Fetus at 17 weeks

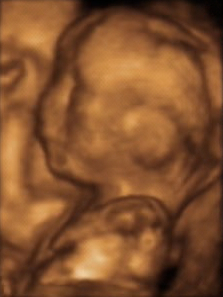
Fetus at 20 weeks

==== First trimester ====
Routine tests in the first trimester of pregnancy generally include:

- Complete blood count
- Blood type
  - Rh-negative antenatal patients should receive RhoGAM at 28 weeks to prevent Rh disease.
- Indirect Coombs test (AGT) to assess risk of hemolytic disease of the newborn
- Rapid plasma reagin test to screen for syphilis
- Rubella antibody screen
- HBsAg test to screen for hepatitis B
- Testing for chlamydia (and gonorrhea when indicated
- Mantoux test for tuberculosis
- Urinalysis and culture
- HIV screen

Genetic screening for Down syndrome (trisomy 21) and Edwards syndrome (trisomy 18), the national standard in the United States, is rapidly evolving away from the AFP-quad screen, done typically in the second trimester at 16–18 weeks. The newer integrated screen (formerly called F.A.S.T.E.R for First And Second Trimester Early Results) can be done at 10 plus weeks to 13 plus weeks with an ultrasound of the fetal neck (thicker nuchal skin correlates with higher risk of Down syndrome being present) and two chemicals (analytes), pregnancy-associated plasma protein A and human chorionic gonadotropin (pregnancy hormone level itself). It gives an accurate risk profile very early. A second blood screen at 15 to 20 weeks refines the risk more accurately. The cost is higher than an "AFP-quad" screen due to the ultrasound and second blood test, but it is quoted to have a 93% pick up rate as opposed to 88% for the standard AFP/QS. This is an evolving standard of care in the United States.

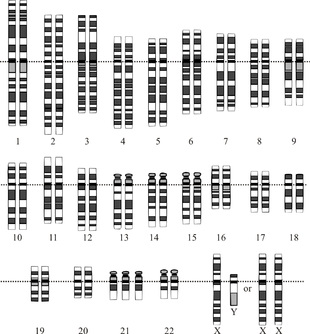
Down syndrome karyotype

==== Second trimester ====
- MSAFP/quad. screen (four simultaneous blood tests) (maternal serum AFP, inhibin A, estriol, and βHCG) – elevations, low numbers or odd patterns correlate with neural tube defect risk and increased risks of trisomy 18 or trisomy 21
- Ultrasound, either abdominal or transvaginal, to assess cervix, placenta, fluid, and baby
- Amniocentesis is the national standard for women over 35 or who reach 35 by mid-pregnancy or who are at increased risk due to family history or prior birth history.

==== Third trimester ====
- Hematocrit (if low, the mother receives iron supplements)
- Group B Streptococcus screen. If positive, the woman receives IV penicillin or ampicillin while in labor—or, if she is allergic to penicillin, an alternative therapy, such as IV clindamycin or IV vancomycin.
- Glucose loading test (GLT) – screens for gestational diabetes; if > 140 mg/dL, a glucose tolerance test (GTT) is administered; a fasting glucose > 105 mg/dL suggests gestational diabetes.

Most doctors do a sugar load in a drink form of 50 grams of glucose in cola, lime or orange and draw blood an hour later (plus or minus 5 minutes). The standard modified criteria have been lowered to 135 since the late 1980s.

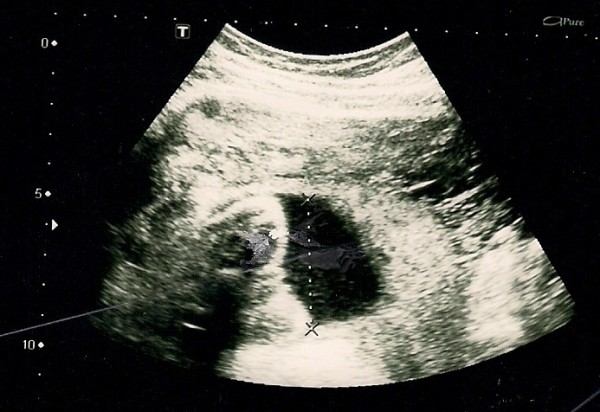
The result of an ultrasonography: a black and white image that shows a clear view of the interior abdomen

==== Fetal assessments ====
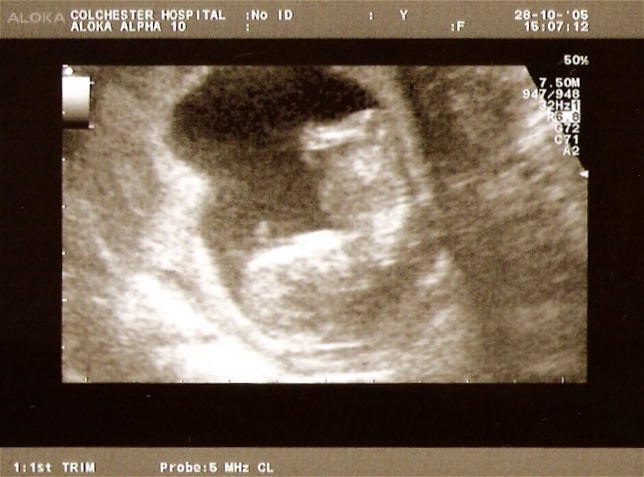
A dating scan at 12 weeks

Obstetric ultrasonography is routinely used for dating the gestational age of a pregnancy from the size of the fetus, determining the number of fetuses and placentae, evaluating for an ectopic pregnancy and first trimester bleeding, with the most accurate dating being in the first trimester before the growth of the fetus has been significantly influenced by other factors. Ultrasound is also used for detecting congenital anomalies (or other foetal anomalies) and determining the biophysical profiles (BPP), which are generally easier to detect in the second trimester when the foetal structures are larger and more developed.

X-rays and computerized tomography (CT) are not used, especially in the first trimester, due to the ionizing radiation, which has teratogenic effects on the foetus. No effects of magnetic resonance imaging (MRI) on the foetus have been demonstrated, but this technique is too expensive for routine observation. Instead, obstetric ultrasonography is the imaging method of choice in the first trimester and throughout the pregnancy, because it emits no radiation, is portable, and allows for real-time imaging.

The safety of frequent ultrasound scanning has not been confirmed. Despite this, increasing numbers of women are choosing to have additional scans for no medical purpose, such as gender scans, 3D, and 4D scans. A normal gestation would reveal a gestational sac, yolk sac, and fetal pole.

The gestational age can be assessed by evaluating the mean gestational sac diameter (MGD) before week 6, and the crown-rump length after week 6. Multiple gestation is evaluated by the number of placentae and amniotic sacs present.

Other tools used for assessment include:

- Fetal screening is used to help assess the viability of the fetus, as well as congenital abnormalities.
- Fetal karyotype can be used for the screening of genetic diseases. This can be obtained via amniocentesis or chorionic villus sampling (CVS)
- Foetal haematocrit for the assessment of foetal anemia, Rh isoimmunization, or hydrops can be determined by percutaneous umbilical blood sampling (PUBS), which is done by placing a needle through the abdomen into the uterus and taking a portion of the umbilical cord.
- Fetal lung maturity is associated with how much surfactant the fetus is producing. Reduced production of surfactant indicates decreased lung maturity and is a high-risk factor for infant respiratory distress syndrome. Typically, a lecithin:sphingomyelin ratio greater than 1.5 is associated with increased lung maturity.
- Nonstress test (NST) for fetal heart rate
- Oxytocin challenge test

== Diseases in pregnancy ==
A pregnant woman may have a pre-existing disease, that may become worse or become a risk to the pregnancy, or to postnatal development of the offspring

- Diabetes mellitus and pregnancy deals with the interactions of diabetes mellitus (not restricted to gestational diabetes) and pregnancy. Risks for the child include miscarriage, growth restriction, growth acceleration, foetal obesity (macrosomia), polyhydramnios and birth defects.
- Lupus and pregnancy confers an increased rate of foetal death in utero and spontaneous abortion (miscarriage), as well as of neonatal lupus.
- Thyroid disease in pregnancy can, if uncorrected, cause adverse effects on foetal and maternal well-being. The deleterious effects of thyroid dysfunction can also extend beyond pregnancy and delivery to affect neurointellectual development in the early life of the child. Demand for thyroid hormones is increased during pregnancy, and may cause a previously unnoticed thyroid disorder to worsen.
- Hypercoagulability in pregnancy is the propensity of pregnant women to develop thrombosis (blood clots). Pregnancy itself is a factor of hypercoagulability (pregnancy-induced hypercoagulability), as a physiologically adaptive mechanism to prevent post partum bleeding. However, when combined with an additional underlying hypercoagulable states, the risk of thrombosis or embolism may become substantial.
- Hyperemesis gravidarum in pregnancy occurs due to extreme, persistent nausea and vomiting during pregnancy. If untreated, can lead to dehydration, weight loss, and electrolyte imbalances. Most women develop nausea and vomiting during the first trimester. The cause of hyperemesis gravidarum is not known. However, it is believed to be caused by a rapidly rising blood level of a hormone, human chorionic gonadotropin (HCG), which is released by the placenta.
- Preeclampsia is a condition that causes high blood pressure during pregnancy. If left untreated, it can be life-threatening. In pregnant women, preeclampsia may occur after 20 weeks of pregnancy, often in women who have no history of high blood pressure. Symptoms of preeclampsia may include severe headache, vision changes, and pain under the ribs. However, in some women, symptoms may not occur until they go for a routine prenatal visit.

=== Induction and labour ===
Induction is a method of artificially or prematurely stimulating labour in a woman. Reasons to induce can include pre-eclampsia, foetal distress, placental malfunction, intrauterine growth retardation, and failure to progress through labour, increasing the risk of infection and foetal distress.

Induction may be achieved via several methods:

- Disturbance of cervical membranes
- Pessary of Prostin cream, prostaglandin E_{2}
- Intravaginal or oral administration of misoprostol
- Cervical insertion of a 30-mL Foley catheter
- Rupturing the amniotic membranes
- Intravenous infusion of synthetic oxytocin (Pitocin or Syntocinon)

During labour, the obstetrician carries out the following tasks:

- Monitor the progress of labour, by reviewing the nursing chart, performing vaginal examination, and assessing the trace produced by a foetal monitoring device (the cardiotocograph)
- Provide pain relief, either by nitrous oxide, opiates, or by epidural anaesthesia done by anaesthestists, an anaesthesiologist, or a nurse anaesthetist.
- Caesarean section, if there is an associated risk with vaginal delivery, such as foetal or maternal compromise.

=== Complications and emergencies ===
The main emergencies include:

- Ectopic pregnancy is when an embryo implants in the uterine (fallopian) tube or (rarely) on the ovary or inside the peritoneal cavity. This may cause massive internal bleeding.
- Pre-eclampsia is a disease defined by a combination of signs and symptoms that are related to maternal hypertension. The cause is unknown, and markers are being sought to predict its development from the earliest stages of pregnancy. Some unknown factors cause vascular damage in the endothelium, causing hypertension. If severe, it progresses to eclampsia, where seizures occur, which can be fatal. Preeclamptic patients with the HELLP syndrome show liver failure and disseminated intravascular coagulation (DIC). The only treatment is to deliver the foetus. Women may still develop pre-eclampsia following delivery.
- Placental abruption is where the placenta detaches from the uterus, and the woman and foetus can bleed to death if not managed appropriately.
- Foetal distress where the foetus is getting compromised in the uterine environment.
- Shoulder dystocia where one of the foetus's shoulders becomes stuck during vaginal birth. There are many risk factors, including macrosmic (large) foetus, but many are also unexplained.
- Uterine rupture can occur during obstructed labour and endanger foetal and maternal life.
- Prolapsed cord can only happen after the membranes have ruptured. The umbilical cord delivers before the presenting part of the foetus. If the foetus is not delivered within minutes, or the pressure is taken off the cord, the foetus dies.
- Obstetrical hemorrhage may be due to several factors such as placenta previa, uterine rupture or tears, uterine atony, retained placenta or placental fragments, or bleeding disorders.
- Puerperal sepsis is an ascending infection of the genital tract. It may happen during or after labour. Signs to look out for include signs of infection (pyrexia or hypothermia, raised heart rate and respiratory rate, reduced blood pressure), and abdominal pain, offensive lochia (blood loss), increased lochia, clots, diarrhea, and vomiting.

=== Postpartum period ===
The World Health Organization makes a distinction between the use of postpartum care when it concerns the care of the mother after giving birth, and postnatal care when the care of the newborn is concerned. Postpartum care is provided to the mother following childbirth.

A woman in the Western world who gives birth in a hospital may leave the hospital as soon as she is medically stable, and chooses to leave, which can be as early as a few hours later, but usually averages a stay of one or two days; the average postnatal stay following delivery by caesarean section is three to four days.

During this time, the mother is monitored for bleeding, bowel and bladder function, and baby care. The infant's health is also monitored.

== History ==
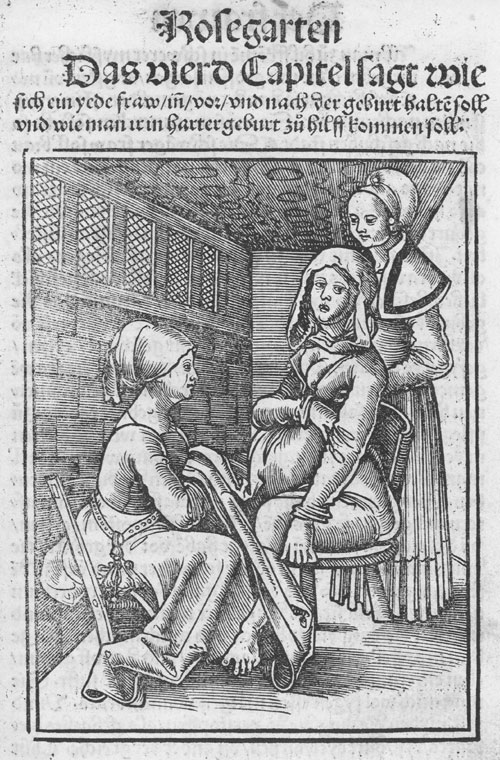
Two midwives assisting a woman in labour on a birthing chair in the 16th century, from a work by Eucharius Rößlin

Before the 18th century, caring for pregnant women in Europe was confined exclusively to women, and rigorously excluded men. The expectant mother would invite close female friends and family members to her home to keep her company during childbirth. Skilled midwives managed all aspects of the labour and delivery. The presence of physicians and surgeons was very rare and only occurred if a serious complication had taken place and the midwife had exhausted all measures at her disposal. Calling a surgeon was very much a last resort and having men deliver women in this era was seen as offending female modesty.

=== Before the 18th century ===
Before the 18th and 19th centuries, midwifery was well established, but obstetrics was not recognized as a specific medical specialty. However, the subject matter and interest in the female reproductive system and sexual practice can be traced back to Ancient Egypt and Ancient Greece. Soranus of Ephesus sometimes is called the most important figure in ancient gynecology. Living in the late first century AD and early second century, he studied anatomy and had opinions and techniques on abortion, contraception – most notably coitus interruptus – and birth complications. After his death, techniques and works of gynecology declined; very little of his work was recorded and survived to the late 18th century, when gynecology and obstetrics reemerged as a medical specialism.

=== 18th century ===
The 18th century marked the beginning of many advances in European midwifery, based on better knowledge of the physiology of pregnancy and labour. By the end of the century, medical professionals began to understand the anatomy of the uterus and the physiological changes that take place during labour. The introduction of forceps in childbirth also took place at this time. All these medical advances in obstetrics were a lever for the introduction of men into an arena previously managed and run by women – midwifery.

The addition of the male-midwife (or man-midwife) is historically a significant change to the profession of obstetrics. In the 18th century medical men began to train in area of childbirth and believed with their advanced knowledge in anatomy that childbirth could be improved. In France these male-midwives were referred to as accoucheurs, a title later used all over Europe. The founding of lying-in hospitals also contributed to the medicalization and male-dominance of obstetrics. These early maternity hospitals were establishments where women would come to have their babies delivered, as opposed to the practice since time immemorial of the midwife attending the home of the woman in labour. This institution provided male-midwives with endless patients to practice their techniques on and was a way for these men to demonstrate their knowledge.

Many midwives of the time bitterly opposed the involvement of men in childbirth. Some male practitioners also opposed the involvement of medical men like themselves in midwifery and even went as far as to say that male midwives only undertook midwifery solely for perverse erotic satisfaction. The accoucheurs argued that their involvement in midwifery was to improve the process of childbirth. These men also believed that obstetrics would forge ahead and continue to strengthen.

=== 19th century ===
18th-century physicians expected that obstetrics would continue to grow, but the opposite happened. Obstetrics entered a stage of stagnation in the 19th century, which lasted until about the 1880s. The central explanation for the lack of advancement during this time was the rejection of obstetrics by the medical community. The 19th century marked an era of medical reform in Europe and increased regulation over the profession. Major European institutions such as The Royal Colleges of Physicians and Surgeons in Glasgow considered delivering babies ungentlemanly work and refused to have anything to do with childbirth as a whole. Even when Medical Act 1858 was introduced, which stated that medical students could qualify as doctors, midwifery was entirely ignored. This made it nearly impossible to pursue an education in midwifery and also have the recognition of being a doctor or surgeon. Obstetrics was pushed to the side.

By the late 19th century, the foundation of modern-day obstetrics and midwifery began to develop. Delivery of babies by doctors became popular and readily accepted, but midwives continued to play a role in childbirth. Midwifery also changed during this era due to increased regulation and the eventual need for midwives to become certified. Many European countries by the late 19th century were monitoring the training of midwives and issuing certification based on competency. Midwives were no longer uneducated in the formal sense.

As midwifery began to develop, so did the profession of obstetrics near the end of the century. Childbirth was no longer unjustifiably despised by the medical community as it once had been at the beginning of the century. But obstetrics was underdeveloped compared to other medical specialties. Many male physicians would deliver children, but very few would have referred to themselves as obstetricians. The end of the 19th century did mark a significant accomplishment in the profession with the advancements in asepsis and anaesthesia, which paved the way for the mainstream introduction and later success of the Caesarean section.

Before the 1880s, mortality rates in lying-hospitals would reach unacceptably high levels and became an area of public concern. Many of these maternal deaths were due to puerperal fever, then known as childbed fever. In the 1800s, Ignaz Semmelweis noticed that women giving birth at home had a much lower incidence of childbed fever than those giving birth by physicians in lying-in-hospitals. His investigation discovered that washing hands with an antiseptic solution before a delivery reduced childbed fever fatalities by 90%. So it was concluded that it was physicians who had been spreading disease from one labouring mother to the next. Despite the publication of this information, doctors still would not wash. It was not until the 20th century that advancements in aseptic technique and the understanding of disease would play a significant role in the decrease of maternal mortality rates among many populations.

=== History of obstetrics in America ===
The development of obstetrics as a practice for accredited doctors happened at the turn of the 18th century and thus was very differently developed in Europe and in the Americas due to the independence of many countries in the Americas from European powers. "Unlike in Europe and the British Isles, where midwifery laws were national, in America, midwifery laws were local and varied widely".

Gynaecology and Obstetrics gained attention in the American medical field at the end of the nineteenth century through the development of such procedures as the ovariotomy. These procedures were then shared with European surgeons who replicated the surgeries. This was a period when antiseptic, aseptic, or anaesthetic measures were just being introduced to surgical and observational procedures, and without these procedures, surgeries were dangerous and often fatal. Following are two surgeons noted for their contributions to these fields, including Ephraim McDowell and J. Marion Sims.

Ephraim McDowell developed a surgical practice in 1795 and performed the first ovariotomy in 1809 on a 47-year-old widow who then lived on for 31 more years. He had attempted to share this with John Bell, under whom he had practiced, but had retired to Italy. Bell was said to have died without seeing the document, but it was published by an associate in Extractions of Diseased Ovaria in 1825. By the mid-century, the surgery was both successfully and unsuccessfully being performed. Pennsylvanian surgeons, the Attlee brothers, made this procedure very routine for a total of 465 surgeries – John Attlee performed 64 successfully of 78 while his brother William reported 387 – between the years of 1843 and 1883. By the middle of the nineteenth century this procedure was successfully performed in Europe by English surgeons Sir Spencer Wells and Charles Clay as well as French surgeons Eugène Koeberlé, Auguste Nélaton and Jules Péan.

J. Marion Sims was the surgeon responsible for being the first treating a vesicovaginal fistula – a condition linked to many caused mainly by prolonged pressing of the foetus against the pelvis or other causes such as rape, hysterectomy, or other operations – and also having been doctor to many European royals and the 20th President of the United States James A. Garfield after he had been shot. Sims does have a controversial medical past. Under the beliefs at the time about pain and the prejudice towards African people, he had practiced his surgical skills and developed skills on slaves. These women were the first patients of modern gynecology. One of the women he operated on was named Anarcha Westcott, the woman he first treated for a fistula.

=== Historical role of gender ===
Women and men inhabited very different roles in natal care up to the 18th century. The role of a physician was exclusively held by men who went to university, an overly male institution, who would theorize anatomy and the process of reproduction based on theological teaching and philosophy. Many beliefs about the female body and menstruation in the 17th and 18th centuries were inaccurate, clearly resulting from the lack of literature about the practice. Many of the theories of what caused menstruation prevailed from Hippocratic philosophy. Midwives, meaning "with woman", were those who assisted in the birth and care of both born and unborn children, a position historically held mainly by women.

During the birth of a child, men were rarely present. Women from the neighbourhood or family would join in on the process of birth and assist in many different ways. The one position where men would help with the birth of a child would be in the sitting position, usually when performed on the side of a bed to support the mother.

Men entered the field of obstetrics in the nineteenth century, resulting in a change of focus within the profession. Gynecology developed as a new and separate field of study from obstetrics, focusing on the curing of illness and indispositions of female sexual organs, encompassing conditions such as menopause, uterine and cervical problems, and tissue damage as a result of childbirth.

== See also ==
- Henry Jacques Garrigues, who introduced antiseptic obstetrics to North America
- Maternal-fetal medicine
- Obstetrical nursing
