= Complications of pregnancy =

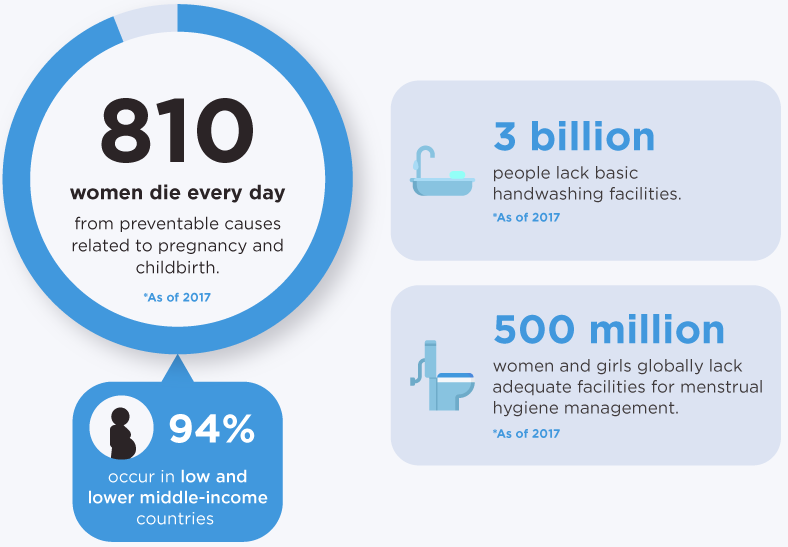
- 810 women die every day from preventable causes related to pregnancy and childbirth. 94% occur in low and lower-middle-income countries.
- Specialty: Obstetrics
- Complications: Numerous biological and environmental complications
- Risk factors: Numerous biological and environmental conditions

Complications of pregnancy are health problems that are related to or arise during pregnancy. Complications that occur primarily during childbirth are termed obstetric labor complications, and problems that occur primarily after childbirth are termed puerperal disorders. While some complications improve or are fully resolved after pregnancy, some may lead to lasting effects, morbidity, or in the most severe cases, maternal or fetal mortality.

Common complications of pregnancy include anemia, gestational diabetes, infections, gestational hypertension, and pre-eclampsia. Presence of these types of complications can have implications on monitoring lab work, imaging, and medical management during pregnancy.

Severe complications of pregnancy, childbirth, and the puerperium are present in 1.6% of mothers in the US, and in 1.5% of mothers in Canada. In the immediate postpartum period (puerperium), 87% to 94% of women report at least one health problem. Long-term health problems (persisting after six months postpartum) are reported by 31% of women.

In 2016, complications of pregnancy, childbirth, and the puerperium resulted in 230,600 deaths globally, down from 377,000 deaths in 1990. The most common causes of maternal mortality are maternal bleeding, postpartum infections including sepsis, hypertensive diseases of pregnancy, obstructed labor, and unsafe abortion.

Complications of pregnancy can sometimes arise from abnormally severe presentations of symptoms and discomforts of pregnancy, which usually do not significantly interfere with activities of daily living or pose any significant threat to the health of the birthing person or fetus. For example, morning sickness is a fairly common mild symptom of pregnancy that generally resolves in the second trimester, but hyperemesis gravidarum is a severe form of this symptom that sometimes requires medical intervention to prevent electrolyte imbalance from severe vomiting.

== Maternal problems ==
Death rate from maternal disorders

Share of women who are expected to die from pregnancy related causes

The following problems originate in the mother; however, they may have serious consequences for the fetus as well.

=== Gestational diabetes ===
Gestational diabetes is when a woman, without a previous diagnosis of diabetes, develops high blood sugar levels during pregnancy. There are many non-modifiable and modifiable risk factors that lead to the development of this complication. Non-modifiable risk factors include a family history of diabetes, advanced maternal age, and ethnicity. Modifiable risk factors include maternal obesity. There is an elevated demand for insulin during pregnancy which leads to increased insulin production from pancreatic beta cells. The elevated demand results from increased maternal calorie intake, weight gain, and increased prolactin and growth hormone production. Gestational diabetes increases the risk for further maternal and fetal complications such as the development of pre-eclampsia, the need for cesarean delivery, preterm delivery, polyhydramnios, macrosomia, shoulder dystocia, fetal hypoglycemia, hyperbilirubinemia, and admission into the neonatal intensive care unit. The increased risk is correlated with how well the gestational diabetes is controlled during pregnancy, with poor control associated with worsened outcomes. A multidisciplinary approach is used to treat gestational diabetes. It involves monitoring blood-glucose levels, nutritional and dietary modifications, lifestyle changes such as increasing physical activity, maternal weight management, and medication such as insulin.

=== Hyperemesis gravidarum ===
Hyperemesis gravidarum is the presence of severe and persistent vomiting, causing dehydration and weight loss. It is similar, although more severe than the common morning sickness. It is estimated to affect 0.3–3.6% of pregnant women and is the greatest contributor to hospitalizations under 20 weeks of gestation. Most often, nausea and vomiting symptoms during pregnancy are resolved in the first trimester; however, some continue to experience symptoms. Hyperemesis gravidarum is diagnosed by the following criteria: greater than 3 vomiting episodes per day, ketonuria, and weight loss of more than 3 kg or 5% of body weight. Several non-modifiable and modifiable risk factors predispose women to the development of this condition, such as a female fetus, psychiatric illness history, high or low BMI pre-pregnancy, young age, African American or Asian ethnicity, type I diabetes, multiple pregnancies, and a history of pregnancy affected by hyperemesis gravidarum. There are currently no known mechanisms for the cause of this condition. This complication can cause nutritional deficiency, low pregnancy weight gain, dehydration, and vitamin, electrolyte, and acid-based disturbances in the mother. It has been shown to cause low birth weight, small size for gestational age, preterm birth, and poor APGAR scores in the infant. Treatments for this condition focus on preventing harm to the fetus while improving symptoms and commonly include fluid replacement and consumption of small, frequent, bland meals. First-line treatments include ginger and acupuncture. Second-line treatments include vitamin B_{6} ± doxylamine, antihistamines, dopamine antagonists, and serotonin antagonists. Third-line treatments include corticosteroids, transdermal clonidine, and gabapentin. Treatments chosen are dependent on the severity of symptoms and response to therapies.

=== Pelvic girdle pain ===
Pelvic girdle pain (PGP) disorder is pain in the area between the posterior iliac crest and gluteal fold, beginning peri or postpartum caused by instability and limitation of mobility. It is associated with pubic symphysis pain and sometimes radiation of pain down the hips and thighs. For most pregnant individuals, PGP resolves within three months following delivery, but for some, it can last for years, resulting in a reduced tolerance for weight-bearing activities. PGP affects around 45% of individuals during pregnancy: 25% report serious pain, and 8% are severely disabled. Risk factors for complication development include multiparity, increased BMI, physically strenuous work, smoking, distress, history of back and pelvic trauma, and previous history of pelvic and lower back pain. This syndrome results from a growing uterus during pregnancy that causes increased stress on the lumbar and pelvic regions of the mother, thereby resulting in postural changes and reduced lumbopelvic muscle strength, leading to pelvic instability and pain. It is unclear whether specific hormones in pregnancy are associated with complication development. PGP can result in poor quality of life, predisposition to chronic pain syndrome, extended leave from work, and psychosocial distress. Many treatment options are available based on symptom severity. Non-invasive treatment options include activity modification, pelvic support garments, analgesia with or without short periods of bed rest, and physiotherapy to increase the strength of gluteal and adductor muscles, reducing stress on the lumbar spine. Invasive surgical management is considered a last-line treatment if all other treatment modalities have failed and symptoms are severe.

=== High blood pressure ===
Potential severe hypertensive states of pregnancy are mainly:

- Pre-eclampsia – gestational hypertension, proteinuria (>300 mg), and edema. Severe pre-eclampsia involves a BP over 160/110 (with additional signs). It affects 5–8% of pregnancies.
- Eclampsia – seizures in a pre-eclamptic patient, affecting around 1.4% of pregnancies.
- Gestational hypertension can develop after 20 weeks but has no other symptoms and may resolve itself, but it can develop into pre-eclampsia.
- HELLP syndrome – Hemolytic anemia, elevated liver enzymes and a low platelet count. Incidence is reported as 0.5–0.9% of all pregnancies.
- Acute fatty liver of pregnancy is sometimes included in the pre-eclamptic spectrum. It occurs in approximately one in 7,000 to one in 15,000 pregnancies.

Women who have chronic hypertension before their pregnancy are at increased risk of complications such as premature birth, low birthweight, or stillbirth. Women who have high blood pressure and had complications in their pregnancy have three times the risk of developing cardiovascular disease compared to women with normal blood pressure who had no complications in pregnancy. Monitoring pregnant women's blood pressure can help prevent both complications and future cardiovascular diseases.

=== Venous thromboembolism ===
Venous thromboembolism, consisting of deep vein thrombosis and pulmonary embolism, is a major risk factor for postpartum morbidity and mortality, especially in highly developed countries. A combination of pregnancy-exacerbated hypercoagulability and additional risk factors such as obesity and thrombophilias makes pregnant women vulnerable to thrombotic events The prophylactic measures that include the usage of low molecular weight heparin can significantly reduce risks associated with surgery, particularly in high-risk patients. Awareness among healthcare givers and prompt response in early identification and management of venous thromboembolism during pregnancy and the postpartum period are both crucial for prompt response. Deep vein thrombosis, a form of venous thromboembolism, has an incidence of 0.5 to 7 per 1,000 pregnancies, and is the second most common cause of maternal death in developed countries after bleeding.

- Caused by: Pregnancy-induced hypercoagulability as a physiological response in preparation for the potential bleeding during childbirth.
- Treatment: Prophylactic treatment, e.g., with low molecular weight heparin may be indicated when additional risk factors for deep vein thrombosis are present.

=== Anemia ===
Anemia is a globally recognized pregnancy complication and is a condition with a low hemoglobin level in one of the trimesters. Such physiological modifications are more pronounced among individuals who suffer from undernutrition as well as chronic diseases associated with hemoglobin reversion, like sickle cell anemia. Prevention of anemia during pregnancy is complicated and is often treated by a team effort of dietary supplementation, iron therapy, and continuous assessment of the mother and fetal indices in a multidisciplinary approach. As an additional measure, emphasis is placed on the astute determination of the respective triggering points, and the application of optimal prenatal care to better maternal and fetal outcome.

Levels of hemoglobin are lower in the third trimester. According to the United Nations (UN) estimates, approximately half of pregnant individuals develop anemia worldwide. Approximately half of pregnant women experience iron deficiency with or without anemia. Anemia prevalence during pregnancy differed from 18% in developed countries to 75% in South Asia; culminating to a global rate of 38% of pregnancies worldwide.

Treatment varies due to the severity of the anaemia, and can be achieved by increasing iron-containing foods, oral iron tablets, or by the use of parenteral iron.

=== Infection ===
Pregnancy is a critical period for the expectant mom to experience additional dangers associated with infections. Moreover, a mother and baby's health is exposed to danger when she is in this condition. The prenatal physiology complexity and immunity modulation inherently increase the risk of influenza, hepatitis E, and cytomegalovirus transmission. Avoidance actions like vaccines and strict infectious control protocols can be given priority in the policies aimed at limiting the risk of transmission among high-risk populations. In addition, early diagnosis and management of maternal infections are among the main methods to prevent vertical transmission and fetal aberrations.

A pregnant woman is more susceptible to certain infections. This increased risk is caused by an increased immune tolerance in pregnancy to prevent an immune reaction against the fetus, as well as secondary to maternal physiological changes, including a decrease in respiratory volumes and urinary stasis due to an enlarging uterus. Pregnant individuals are more severely affected by, for example, influenza, hepatitis E, herpes simplex and malaria. The evidence is more limited for coccidioidomycosis, measles, smallpox, and varicella. Mastitis, or inflammation of the breast, occurs in 20% of lactating individuals.Some infections are vertically transmissible, meaning that they can affect the child as well.

=== Peripartum cardiomyopathy ===
Peripartum cardiomyopathy is a heart failure caused by a decrease in left ventricular ejection fraction (LVEF) to <45%, which occurs towards the end of pregnancy or a few months postpartum. Symptoms include shortness of breath in various positions and/or with exertion, fatigue, pedal edema, and chest tightness. Risk factors associated with the development of this complication include maternal age over 30 years, multi-gestational pregnancy, family history of cardiomyopathy, previous diagnosis of cardiomyopathy, pre-eclampsia, hypertension, and African ancestry. The pathogenesis of peripartum cardiomyopathy is not yet known; however, it is suggested that multifactorial potential causes could include autoimmune processes, viral myocarditis, nutritional deficiencies, and maximal cardiovascular changes, which increase cardiac preload. Peripartum cardiomyopathy can lead to many complications such as cardiopulmonary arrest, pulmonary edema, thromboembolisms, brain injury, and death. Treatment of this condition is very similar to treatment of non-gravid heart failure patients; however, the safety of the fetus must be prioritized. For example, for anticoagulation due to increased risk for thromboembolism, low molecular weight heparin, which is safe for use during pregnancy, is used instead of warfarin, which crosses the placenta.

=== Hypothyroidism ===
Hypothyroidism (commonly caused by Hashimoto's disease) is an autoimmune disease that affects the thyroid by causing low thyroid hormone levels. Symptoms of hypothyroidism can include low energy, cold intolerance, muscle cramps, constipation, and memory and concentration problems. It is diagnosed by the presence of elevated levels of thyroid-stimulating hormone or TSH. Patients with elevated TSH and decreased levels of free thyroxine or T4 are considered to have overt hypothyroidism. Those with elevated TSH and normal levels of free T4 are considered to have subclinical hypothyroidism. Risk factors for developing hypothyroidism during pregnancy include iodine deficiency, history of thyroid disease, visible goiter, hypothyroidism symptoms, family history of thyroid disease, history of type 1 diabetes or autoimmune conditions, and history of infertility or fetal loss. Various hormones during pregnancy affect the thyroid and increase thyroid hormone demand. For example, during pregnancy, there is increased urinary iodine excretion as well as increased thyroxine binding globulin and thyroid hormone degradation, which all increase thyroid hormone demands. This condition can have a profound effect on the mother and fetus during pregnancy. The infant may be seriously affected and have a variety of birth defects. Complications in the mother and fetus can include pre-eclampsia, anemia, miscarriage, low birth weight, stillbirth, congestive heart failure, impaired neurointellectual development, and, if severe, congenital iodine deficiency syndrome. This complication is treated by iodine supplementation, levothyroxine, which is a form of thyroid hormone replacement, and close monitoring of thyroid function.

=== Acute fatty liver of pregnancy ===
Acute fatty liver of pregnancy (ALFP) is a rare but serious complication of pregnancy that can result in extensive morbidity or mortality to the mother and fetus. AFLP happens when fat builds up inside the liver. It is thought to be caused by the buildup of fat cells within the microvesicles of live cells due to mitochondrial dysfunction in fat breakdown (fatty acid β-oxidation). This can prevent the liver from functioning normally; however, its exact mechanism is not clearly understood. Diagnosis is supported by abnormal ultrasound findings of the liver or microvascular fatty infiltration of biopsy of the liver. AFLP may cause symptoms of excessive fatigue, vomiting, stomach pain, or jaundice. Individuals may also have low blood sugar, trouble thinking clearly, or bleeding problems.

Summary of signs and symptoms

- Vomiting
- Abdominal pain
- Excessive thirst/urination
- Encephalopathy

AFLP is a medical emergency and requires urgent delivery. Children of mothers with ALFP are at risk of low blood sugar, dilated cardiomyopathy, neuromyopathy, and sudden infant death syndrome.

Swansea Criteria for the diagnosis of AFLP. The presence of ≥6 abnormal variables had positive predictive value of 85% and negative predictive value of 100 percent for finding microvascular steatosis:

| Signs and symptoms | 1. Vomiting |
| Signs and symptoms | 2. Abdominal pain |
| Signs and symptoms | 3. Polydipsia/polyuria |
| Signs and symptoms | 4. Encephalopathy |
| Lab findings | 5. Elevated bilirubin ( >0.8 mg/dL) |
| Lab findings | 6. Hypoglycemia (glucose < 72 mg/dL) |
| Lab findings | 7. Leukocytosis ( >11,000 cells/microL) |
| Lab findings | 8. Elevated transaminases (AST or ALT) ( >42 international unit/L) |
| Lab findings | 9. Elevated ammonia ( >47 micromol/L) |
| Lab findings | 10. Elevated urate (5.7 mg/dL) |
| Lab findings | 11. AKI or Creatinine >1.7 mg/dl |
| Lab findings | 12. Coagulopathy or prothrombin time >14 seconds |
| Imaging | 13. Ascites or a bright liver on ultrasound scan |
| Histology | 14. Microvesicular steatosis on liver biopsy |

AFLP can lead to acute liver failure. Acute liver failure is a medical emergency, and prompt recognition and treatment with dialysis, delivery, and other supportive measures have been shown to decrease the risk of both maternal and fetal complications.

== Fetal and placental problems ==
The following problems occur in the fetus or placenta, but may have serious consequences on the mother as well.

=== Ectopic pregnancy ===
Ectopic pregnancy is implantation of the embryo outside the uterus. This form of complicated pregnancy, which is an implantation of a normally fertilized egg at any spot other than the uterus, involves operation failure, which can cause life-threatening conditions. However, the underlying reasons for this are not exactly known. This phenomenon is often accompanied by Pelvic inflammatory disease (PID), or salpingectomy (surgery).

- Caused by: Unknown, but risk factors include smoking, advanced maternal age, and prior surgery or trauma to the fallopian tubes.
- Risk factors include untreated pelvic inflammatory disease, likely due to fallopian tube scarring.
- Treatment: In most cases, keyhole surgery must be carried out to remove the fetus, along with the fallopian tube. If the pregnancy is very early, it may resolve on its own, or it can be treated with methotrexate, an abortifacient.

=== Miscarriage ===
Miscarriage is the loss of a pregnancy before 20 weeks. In the UK, miscarriage is defined as the loss of a pregnancy during the first 23 weeks. Comprehensive support, consists of the consultation of the genomics as well as the provision of the medical or surgical operations required. The psychological relevance of family members, relatives, and friends to the bereaved ones is also crucial. The most effective tools that can be used to minimize the psychological implications of the mourners include autopsy and bereavement counseling.

Approximately 80% of pregnancy loss occurs in the first trimester, with a decrease in risk after 12 weeks of gestation. Some variables, such as the mother's being older or chromosomal abnormalities, possess a higher likelihood of causing multiple miscarriages. Spontaneous abortions can be further categorized into complete, inevitable, missed, and threatened abortions:

- Complete: Vaginal bleeding occurs, followed by the complete passing of conception products through the cervix.
- Inevitable: Vaginal bleeding occurs; the cervical os is closed, indicating that conception products will pass soon.
- Missed: Vaginal bleeding occurs, and some products of conception may have passed through the cervix; the cervical os is closed, and ultrasound shows a nonviable fetus and remaining products of conception.
- Threatened: Vaginal bleeding occurs; the cervical os is closed, and ultrasound shows a viable fetus.

=== Stillbirth ===
Stillbirth is defined as fetal loss or death after 20 weeks of gestation. Early stillbirth is between 20 and 27 weeks of gestation, while late stillbirth is between 28 and 36 weeks of gestation. A term stillbirth is when the fetus dies 37 weeks and above. This phenomenon can go beyond grief and can lead to worries about strange maternal feelings or postpartum treatment regarding complications of childbirth. Such parents would require more than empathy; generally, adequate medical programs should be considered for parents having such unbearable grief. Along with psychiatric help, counseling, and peer support, which should be useful in the process of assisting parents who have lost their children.

- Epidemiology: There are over 2 million stillbirths a year and there are about 6 stillbirths per 1000 births (0.6%)
- Clinical presentation: Fetal behavioral changes like decreased movements or a loss in fetal sensation may indicate stillbirth, but the presentation can vary greatly.
- Risk factors: Maternal weight, age, and smoking, as well as pre-existing maternal diabetes or hypertension
- Treatment: If fetal passing occurs before labor, treatment options include induced labor or cesarean section. Otherwise, stillbirths can pass with a natural birth.

=== Placental abruption ===
Placental abruption, defined as the separation of the placenta from the uterus before delivery, is a major cause of third-trimester vaginal bleeding and complicates about 1% of pregnancies. Symptomatic presentations are variable: Some women can entirely ignore the symptoms, while others have mild bleeding or abdominal discomfort and pain. Hence, though symptom severity variance and precipitous placental separation are not relevant, they can still cause the diagnosis and clinical management to be complicated.

Several contributors may result in placental abruption. This includes: pre-existing maternal factors (e.g., smoking, hypertension, advanced age), as well as pregnancy-related factors such as multiple pregnancies or the presence of in-utero infections. Identifying risk factors beforehand to take steps and make quick reactions to minimize the likelihood of unfavorable outcomes for the mother or the fetus is essential. The therapy techniques for placental rupture are based on the fetal gestation age and the status of both the mother and the baby. Instant delivery should be medically warranted for full-term babies (36 weeks or more) and in case of distress. Milder cases with immature embryos are monitored closely, and any necessary intervention is done in time after careful observation.

Preventive measures, which include pre-conception counseling to deal with the modifiable risk factors, can significantly reduce incidents of placental abruption. Knowing the long-term impacts on the mother and the baby after giving birth is essential. Continuous research and evidence-based approaches help in providing management that works. Collaboration between healthcare providers and patients is the core of the outcomes of placenta abruption.

- Clinical Presentation: Varies widely from asymptomatic to vaginal bleeding and abdominal pain.
- Risk factors: Prior abruption, smoking, trauma, cocaine use, multifetal gestation, hypertension, preeclampsia, thrombophilias, advanced maternal age, preterm premature rupture of membranes, intrauterine infections, and hydramnios.
- Treatment: Immediate delivery if the fetus is mature (36 weeks or older), or if a younger fetus or the mother is in distress. In less severe cases with immature fetuses, the situation may be monitored in the hospital, with treatment if necessary.

=== Placenta previa ===
Placenta previa is a condition that occurs when the placenta fully or partially covers the cervix. Placenta previa can be further categorized into complete previa, partial previa, marginal previa, and low-lying placenta, depending on the degree to which the placenta covers the internal cervical os. Placenta previa is primarily diagnosed by ultrasound, either during a routine examination or following an episode of abnormal vaginal bleeding, often in the second trimester of pregnancy. Most placenta previa cases are diagnosed during the second trimester.Treatments are adapted according to their severity and the mother's state of health, from strict monitoring to cesarean section.

- Risk Factors: prior cesarean delivery, pregnancy termination, intrauterine surgery, smoking, multifetal gestation, increasing parity, maternal age.

=== Placenta Accreta ===
Placenta accreta is an abnormal adherence of the placenta to the uterine wall. Specifically, placenta accreta involves abnormal adherence of the placental trophoblast to the uterine myometrium.

Placenta accreta risk factors include placenta previa, abnormally elevated second-trimester AFP and free β-hCG levels, and advanced gestational parent age, specifically over the age of 35. Furthermore, prior cesarean delivery is one of the most common risk factors for placenta accreta due to the presence of a uterine scar leading to abnormal decidualization of the placenta.Due to abnormal adherence of the placenta to the uterine wall, cesarean delivery is often indicated, as well as cesarean hysterectomy.

=== Umbilical Cord Prolapse ===
Umbilical cord prolapse is a rare and dangerous pregnancy complication that can result in significant adverse outcomes for the mother and fetus. Umbilical cord prolapse is defined by the displacement of the umbilical cord beyond the cervical os before the fetus during labor or delivery. This can lead to compression of the umbilical cord and result in low levels of oxygen being delivered to the fetus, which can result in fetal morbidity and mortality.

Several risk factors for umbilical cord prolapse have been identified, including maternal age greater than 35 years, multiple prior pregnancies, fetal presentations in which the fetal head is not oriented towards the mother's pelvis during delivery, preterm labor (<37 weeks of gestation), low birth weight, excess amniotic fluid, multiple gestation pregnancy, and male sex of the newborn.

Umbilical cord prolapse may result in either severe or complete sudden oxygen deprivation, or a gradual lack of oxygen, each causing distinct effects on the newborn. Umbilical cord prolapse is an obstetrical emergency that requires prompt delivery of the fetus. Caesarean section is the most common method; a vaginal or assisted delivery may be considered if it can be performed more rapidly.

Several approaches can be used to help relieve umbilical cord compression until a cesarean section is performed. These include administering short-acting tocolytic agents, placing the patient in the Trendelenburg or knee-chest position, elevating the buttocks, and filling the maternal bladder.

=== Multiple pregnancies ===
Multiple births may become monochorionic, sharing the same chorion, with resultant risk of twin-to-twin transfusion syndrome. Monochorionic multiples may even become monoamniotic, sharing the same amniotic sac, resulting in risk of umbilical cord compression and entanglement. In very rare cases, there may be conjoined twins, possibly impairing the function of internal organs. Control of multiple pregnancies, such as special prenatal care and birth plans, can help in the control of placenta accreta. Moreover, early detection and response to the health problems arising from multiple pregnancies can help both the expectant parents and medical care providers deal with this particular aspect of reproductive health consciously.

=== Mother-to-child transmission ===
Since the embryo and fetus have little or no immune function, they depend on the immune function of their mother. Several pathogens can cross the placenta and cause (perinatal) infection. Often, microorganisms that produce minor illnesses in the mother are very dangerous for the developing embryo or fetus. This can result in spontaneous abortion or major developmental disorders. For many infections, the baby is more at risk at particular stages of pregnancy. Problems related to perinatal infection are not always directly noticeable.

The term TORCH complex refers to a set of several different infections that may be caused by transplacental infection:

- T - Toxoplasmosis
- O - other infections (i.e., Parvovirus B19, Coxsackievirus, Chickenpox, Chlamydia, HIV, HTLV, syphilis, and Zika virus)
- R - Rubella
- C - Cytomegalovirus
- H - Herpes Simplex Virus (HSV)

Babies can also become infected by their mother during birth. During birth, babies are exposed to maternal blood and body fluids without the placental barrier intervening and to the maternal genital tract. Because of this, blood-borne microorganisms (hepatitis B, HIV), organisms associated with sexually transmitted disease (e.g., gonorrhoea and chlamydia), and normal fauna of the genito-urinary tract (e.g., Candida) are among those commonly seen in infection of newborns. Furthermore, vaccination, commitment to safe birth practices, and prenatal screening and treatment of infections are also strategic measures that can help reduce the risk of newborn infections.

== General risk factors ==
Factors increasing the risk (to either the pregnant individual, the fetus/es, or both) of pregnancy complications beyond the normal level of risk may be present in the pregnant individual's medical profile either before they become pregnant or during the pregnancy. These pre-existing factors may be related to the individual's genetics, physical or mental health, their environment and social issues, or a combination of those.

=== Biological ===
Some common biological risk factors include:

- Age of either parent
  - Adolescent parents: Young mothers are at an increased risk of developing certain complications, including preterm birth and low infant birth weight.
  - Older parents: As they age, both mothers and fathers are at an increased risk for complications in the fetus and during pregnancy and childbirth. Complications for those 45 or older include increased risk of primary Caesarean delivery (i.e. C-section).
- Height: Pregnancy in individuals whose height is less than 1.5 meters (5 feet) correlates with a higher incidence of preterm birth and underweight babies. Also, these individuals are more likely to have a small pelvis, which can result in such complications during childbirth as shoulder dystocia.
- Weight
  - Low weight: Individuals whose pre-pregnancy weight is less than 45.5 kilograms (100 pounds) are more likely to have underweight babies.
  - High weight: Obese individuals are more likely to have very large babies, potentially increasing difficulties in childbirth. Obesity also increases the chances of developing gestational diabetes, high blood pressure, preeclampsia, experiencing postterm pregnancy and requiring a cesarean delivery.
- Pre-existing disease in pregnancy, or an acquired disease: A disease and condition not necessarily directly caused by the pregnancy.
  - Diabetes mellitus in pregnancy
  - Lupus in pregnancy
  - Thyroid disease in pregnancy
- Risks arising from previous pregnancies: Complications experienced during a previous pregnancy are more likely to recur.
  - Multiple pregnancies: Individuals who have had more than five previous pregnancies face increased risks of rapid labor and excessive bleeding after delivery.
  - Multiple gestation (having more than one fetus in a single pregnancy): These individuals have an increased risk of mislocated placenta.

=== Environmental ===
Some common environmental risk factors during pregnancy include:

- Exposure to environmental toxins
  - Ionizing radiation
- Exposure to recreational drugs
  - Alcohol: Use during pregnancy can cause fetal alcohol syndrome and fetal alcohol spectrum disorder.
  - Tobacco use: During pregnancy, causes twice the risk of premature rupture of membranes, placental abruption and placenta previa. Also, it increases the odds of the baby being born prematurely by 30%.
  - Prenatal cocaine exposure: Associated with premature birth, birth defects and attention deficit disorder.
  - Prenatal methamphetamine exposure: Can cause premature birth and congenital abnormalities. Other investigations have revealed short-term neonatal outcomes to include small deficits in infant neurobehavioral function and growth restriction when compared to control infants. Also, prenatal methamphetamine use is believed to have long-term effects in terms of brain development, which may last for many years.
  - Cannabis: Possibly associated with adverse effects on the child later in life.
- Social and socioeconomic factors: Generally speaking, unmarried individuals and those in lower socioeconomic groups experience an increased level of risk in pregnancy, due at least in part to lack of access to appropriate prenatal care.
- Unintended pregnancy: Unintended pregnancies preclude preconception care and delay prenatal care. They preclude other preventive care, may disrupt life plans, and, on average, have worse health and psychological outcomes for the mother and, if birth occurs, the child.
- Exposure to pharmaceutical drugs: Certain anti-depressants may increase risks of preterm delivery.
- Stress
  - An elevated level of stress during pregnancy leads to notorious pregnancy outcomes, including preterm birth, low birth weight, and mental health problems for the mother.
  - Prolonged effects of chronic stressors such as discrimination, intimate partner violence, housing issues, and poverty lead to widespread maternal health issues and adverse pregnancy outcomes.
  - Pregnancy-specific anxiety may also be associated with changes in maternal brain activity. Women with higher levels of pregnancy-related anxiety showed differences in brain activity associated with emotional regulation, suggesting that increased stress and anxiety during pregnancy may influence the brain systems involved in regulating emotions and responding to stress.
- Culture
  - Cultural norms, convictions, and traditions connected to pregnancy and childbirth lead people to establish perceptions, habits, and treatment-seeking. Cultural determinants affect the assessment of prenatal care utilization, childbirth practice, dietary habits, and reproductive health beliefs, which are direct outcomes of pregnancy and health situations.

=== High-risk pregnancy ===
Some disorders and conditions can mean that pregnancy is considered high-risk (about 6-8% of pregnancies in the USA) and, in extreme cases, may be contraindicated. High-risk pregnancies are the main focus of doctors specialising in maternal-fetal medicine. Serious pre-existing disorders which can reduce a woman's physical ability to survive pregnancy include a range of congenital defects (that is, conditions with which the woman herself was born, for example, those of the heart or reproductive organs, some of which are listed above) and diseases acquired at any time during the woman's life.

Absolute and relative incidence of venous thromboembolism (VTE) during pregnancy and the postpartum period
Absolute incidence of first VTE per 10,000 person–years during pregnancy and the postpartum period
| | Swedish data A | | Swedish data B | | English data | | Danish data | |
| Time period | N | Rate (95% CI) | N | Rate (95% CI) | NФВяы | Rate (95% CI) | N | Rate (95% CI) |
|---|---|---|---|---|---|---|---|---|
| Outside pregnancy | 1105 | 4.2 (4.0–4.4) | 1015 | 3.8 (?) | 1480 | 3.2 (3.0–3.3) | 2895 | 3.6 (3.4–3.7) |
| Antepartum | 995 | 20.5 (19.2–21.8) | 690 | 14.2 (13.2–15.3) | 156 | 9.9 (8.5–11.6) | 491 | 10.7 (9.7–11.6) |
| Trimester 1 | 207 | 13.6 (11.8–15.5) | 172 | 11.3 (9.7–13.1) | 23 | 4.6 (3.1–7.0) | 61 | 4.1 (3.2–5.2) |
| Trimester 2 | 275 | 17.4 (15.4–19.6) | 178 | 11.2 (9.7–13.0) | 30 | 5.8 (4.1–8.3) | 75 | 5.7 (4.6–7.2) |
| Trimester 3 | 513 | 29.2 (26.8–31.9) | 340 | 19.4 (17.4–21.6) | 103 | 18.2 (15.0–22.1) | 355 | 19.7 (17.7–21.9) |
| Around delivery | 115 | 154.6 (128.8–185.6) | 79 | 106.1 (85.1–132.3) | 34 | 142.8 (102.0–199.8) | – | |
| Postpartum | 649 | 42.3 (39.2–45.7) | 509 | 33.1 (30.4–36.1) | 135 | 27.4 (23.1–32.4) | 218 | 17.5 (15.3–20.0) |
| Early postpartum | 584 | 75.4 (69.6–81.8) | 460 | 59.3 (54.1–65.0) | 177 | 46.8 (39.1–56.1) | 199 | 30.4 (26.4–35.0) |
| Late postpartum | 65 | 8.5 (7.0–10.9) | 49 | 6.4 (4.9–8.5) | 18 | 7.3 (4.6–11.6) | 319 | 3.2 (1.9–5.0) |
Incidence rate ratios (IRRs) of first VTE during pregnancy and the postpartum period
| | Swedish data A | | Swedish data B | | English data | | Danish data | |
| Time period | IRR* (95% CI) | | IRR* (95% CI) | | IRR (95% CI)† | | IRR (95% CI)† | |
| Outside pregnancy | Reference (i.e., 1.00) | | | | | | | |
| Antepartum | 5.08 (4.66–5.54) | | 3.80 (3.44–4.19) | | 3.10 (2.63–3.66) | | 2.95 (2.68–3.25) | |
| Trimester 1 | 3.42 (2.95–3.98) | | 3.04 (2.58–3.56) | | 1.46 (0.96–2.20) | | 1.12 (0.86–1.45) | |
| Trimester 2 | 4.31 (3.78–4.93) | | 3.01 (2.56–3.53) | | 1.82 (1.27–2.62) | | 1.58 (1.24–1.99) | |
| Trimester 3 | 7.14 (6.43–7.94) | | 5.12 (4.53–5.80) | | 5.69 (4.66–6.95) | | 5.48 (4.89–6.12) | |
| Around delivery | 37.5 (30.9–44.45) | | 27.97 (22.24–35.17) | | 44.5 (31.68–62.54) | | – | |
| Postpartum | 10.21 (9.27–11.25) | | 8.72 (7.83–9.70) | | 8.54 (7.16–10.19) | | 4.85 (4.21–5.57) | |
| Early postpartum | 19.27 (16.53–20.21) | | 15.62 (14.00–17.45) | | 14.61 (12.10–17.67) | | 8.44 (7.27–9.75) | |
| Late postpartum | 2.06 (1.60–2.64) | | 1.69 (1.26–2.25) | | 2.29 (1.44–3.65) | | 0.89 (0.53–1.39) | |
Notes: Swedish data A = Using any code for VTE regardless of confirmation. Swedish data B = Using only algorithm-confirmed VTE. Early postpartum = First 6 weeks after delivery. Late postpartum = More than 6 weeks after delivery. * = Adjusted for age and calendar year. † = Unadjusted ratio calculated based on the data provided. Source:

== List of complications (complete) ==
Obstetric complications are those complications that develop during pregnancy. A woman may develop an infection, syndrome, or complication that is not unique to pregnancy and that may have existed before pregnancy. Pregnancy often is complicated by preexisting and concurrent conditions. Though these pre-existing and concurrent conditions may have a great impact on pregnancy, they are not included in the following list.

- Abnormal labor and delivery
- Abnormality of maternal pelvic organs
- Acute fatty liver of pregnancy
- Amniotic fluid embolism
- Antiphospholipid antibody syndrome
- Arcuate uterus
- Breech delivery
- Cephalopelvic disproportion
- Chorioamnionitis
- Chromosome abnormalities
- Deep vein thrombosis
- Delayed delivery
- Eclampsia
- Ectopic pregnancy
- Fetal alcohol spectrum disorder
- Fetal death
- Fetal growth restriction
- Fetal-to-mother hemorrhage
- Gestational diabetes
- Gestational pemphigoid
- Gestational trophoblastic disease
- Haemorrhoids in pregnancy
- Hair growth changes
- HELLP syndrome
- Hemoglobinopathies
- Herpes gestationitis
- Hydramnios
- Hyperemesis gravidarum
- Hyperpigmentation
- Hypertension
- Hysterectomy after delivery
- Immune tolerance in pregnancy
- Incompetent cervix
- Incontinence
- Intrahepatic cholestasis of pregnancy
- Low birth-weight infant
- Lupus
- Macrosomia
- Mastitis
- Maternal death
- Mendelian disorders
- Spontaneous abortion
- Molar pregnancy
- Triplets and more
- Neonatal infection
- Nonmedelian disorders
- Obstetric embolism
- Obstetric fistula
- Obstetrical tetanus
- Oligohydramnios
- Pelvic girdle pain
- Perineal tear
- Peripartum cardiomyopathy
- Placenta previa
- Placental abruption
- Posterm infant
- Postpartum acute renal failure
- Postpartum bleeding
- Postpartum depression
- Postpartum infection
- Postpartum nephritis
- Postpartum thyroiditis
- Preeclampsia
- Pregnancy-induced hypercoagulability
- Pregnancy-related peripheral neuritis
- Premature rupture of membranes
- Preterm birth
- Prior Cesarean delivery
- Prurigo gestationis
- Pruritic urticarial papaules of pregnancy
- Rh disease
- Pruritic urticarial papules and plaques of pregnancy
- Seizures
- Septic pelvic thrombosis
- Shoulder dystocia
- Stillbirth
- Thyroid disease in pregnancy
- Twin pregnancy
- Twin to Twin transfusion syndrome
- Unicornuate uterus
- Uterine incarceration
- Uterine rupture
- Vertically transmitted infection

== See also ==
- List of obstetric topics
- Dermatoses of pregnancy
- Thyroid disease in pregnancy
- Reproductive Health Supplies Coalition
