= High-risk pregnancy =

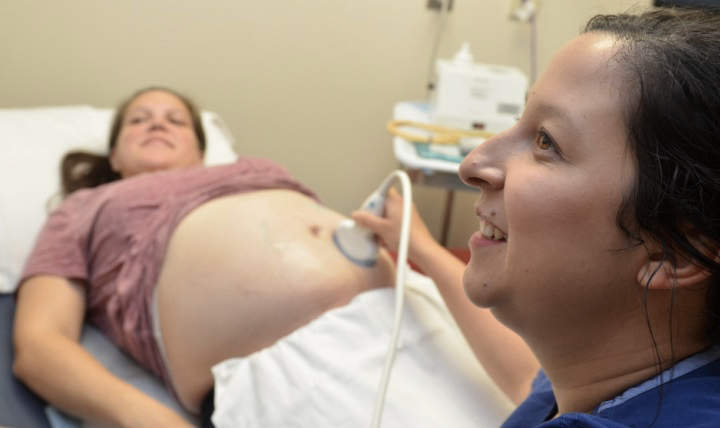
- Ultrasound during pregnancy
- Specialty: Obstetrics, midwifery
- Risk factors: High blood pressure, diabetes, heart disease, renal disease, autoimmune disease, fetal growth restriction, multiple gestations, congenital fetal abnormalities
- Diagnostic method: Based on symptoms, imaging, screening

A high-risk pregnancy is a pregnancy where the gestational carrier or the fetus has an increased risk of adverse outcomes compared to uncomplicated pregnancies. No concrete guidelines currently exist for distinguishing "high-risk" pregnancies from "low-risk" pregnancies; however, there are certain studied conditions that have been shown to put the gestational carrier or fetus at a higher risk of poor outcomes. These conditions can be classified into three main categories: health problems in the gestational carrier that occur before the pregnancy, health problems in the gestational carrier that occur during pregnancy, and certain health conditions with the fetus. There are typically ways to medically manage all of these complications, as well as emotionally manage them with anxiety management and high-risk pregnancy specialists.

In 2012, the CDC estimated that there are approximately 65,000 pregnancies deemed "high-risk" in the United States each year. Across the US, 6-8% of women develop a high-risk complication within their pregnancy. Globally, there are 20 million high-risk pregnancies each year.

== Causes ==
=== Gestational Parent-related factors ===
Pregnancies may be considered high-risk if the gestational parent has certain pre-existing health conditions. These include age, chronic high blood pressure, pre-existing diabetes, cardiac/heart diseases, and autoimmune disease.

Older age is considered to be a risk factor in pregnancies. Pregnancies in gestational parents over the age of 35 are considered "advanced age". First-time pregnant gestational parents in this age group may have normal pregnancies, but research indicates that these women are at increased risk of having: first trimester miscarriage, chromosomal abnormalities in the fetus, and fetal growth restriction (FGR). Advanced age is associated with a higher risk for fetal chromosomal abnormalities such as Down Syndrome (Trisomy 21) and Trisomy 13. Some of these chromosomal abnormalities are further associated with an increased risk of miscarriage in the first trimester. It is not yet well-understood how older age leads to increased risk of FGR, but studies have suggested that it could be related to placenta dysfunction. Furthermore, younger age can also be a risk factor in pregnancies. Pregnant teenagers are more likely to develop anemia, have preterm births, and have low birth weight babies.

Having chronic high blood pressure can further lead to high-risk pregnancies. The CDC estimates the rate of chronic hypertension in the US as 166.9 per 100,000 hospital deliveries. Hypertension is considered a risk factor for high-risk pregnancy because it leads to an increased risk of pre-eclampsia, restricted fetal growth, and preterm birth. It is not yet well-understood how hypertension leads to increased risk of these outcomes. However, it is thought that hypertension leads to decreased blood flow to the placenta. Decreased blood flow to the fetus could lead to restricted growth and trigger other changes that increase the risk of pre-eclampsia, restricted fetal growth, and pre-term birth.

Pre-existing diabetes that is not managed during pregnancy is associated with increased risk of spontaneous abortions in the first few weeks of pregnancy and increased risk of congenital malformations such as congenital heart defects and neural tube defects. The mechanism through which hyperglycemia results in these malformations is still an area being studied, but increased oxidative stress resulting from hyperglycemia is a potential contributor. Pre-existing diabetes is also associated with an increased risk of high birth weight or macrosomia and preterm birth. Macrosomia can put the fetus at risk of brachial plexus injury due to shoulder dystocia during vaginal delivery.

During pregnancy, there is an increase in the volume of circulating blood. In gestational parents with cardiac disease, this increased blood volume can worsen/exacerbate existing heart disease. Autoimmune disease can also cause high-risk pregnancies, as the varying symptoms can induce chronic stress, fatigue, and other illnesses.

=== Fetal-related factors ===
In some pregnancies, certain conditions that arise in the developing fetus or fetuses can put a pregnancy into a high-risk category. In these situations, special care must be taken during the pregnancy to address these factors while the fetus is still in the womb to reduce the chances of morbidity and mortality. Common fetal-related factors that can cause a high-risk pregnancy include congenital defects, multiple gestations, and fetal growth restriction.

=== Pregnancy-related factors ===
Other reasons a pregnancy may be classified as high-risk include if the gestational parent develops a medical condition during pregnancy or if complications occur during pregnancy.

Conditions that can be developed during pregnancy include pre-eclampsia, eclampsia, HELLP syndrome, and gestational diabetes. Other risk factors include the timing of pregnancies, the placenta itself, infections, pregnancy with an IUD device, twin-to-twin transfusion syndrome, substance abuse, medical neglect, socioeconomic status, race, and ethnicity.

Pre-eclampsia is a syndrome marked by a sudden increase in the blood pressure of a gestational parent after the 20th week of pregnancy. It can affect the kidneys, liver, and brain. When left untreated, the condition can be fatal for the gestational parent and/or the fetus and result in long-term health problems. Eclampsia is a more severe form of preeclampsia, marked by seizures and coma in the mother.

HELLP Syndrome is a pregnancy complication which impacts the liver and blood flow. It is commonly associated with pre-eclampsia. In order to prevent HELLP syndrome, early detection and prevention is recommended. Medical professionals may also induce labor as a way of reducing mortality. Post-partum, gestational parents must be monitored for signs of complications as a result of HELLP syndrome.

Gestational diabetes (GDM) is diabetes that first develops when a gestational carrier is pregnant. Many gestational carriers can have healthy pregnancies if they manage their diabetes, following a diet and treatment plan from their health care provider. Uncontrolled gestational diabetes increases the risk for adverse perinatal outcomes such as preterm labor and delivery, preeclampsia, and other hypertension-related conditions in pregnancy. Additionally, some evidence suggests that GDM is associated with long-term outcomes such as development of type 2 diabetes in the mother and future obesity in the infant.

Timing of pregnancy, such as preterm birth (infants born before 37 weeks of pregnancy), PROM (Pre-labor Rupture of Membranes), and post-term pregnancy (infants born after 42 weeks of pregnancy) may lead to pregnancy complications. Furthermore, the placenta is a structure within the uterus that facilitates exchange of nutrients, oxygen, and waste products between the mother and the fetus. When this connection between gestational carrier and fetus is abnormally positioned, the pregnancy is more complicated and requires careful delivery technique. Issues include placental abruption, Placenta Previa, and Placenta accreta spectrum.

Different types of infections may be spread from gestational parent to fetus, predisposing adverse pregnancy outcomes. An existing infection in the gestational parent may be passed along to the fetus during pregnancy through the placenta. A newborn infant is also directly exposed to pathogens during delivery through the vaginal canal or breastfeeding. Fetal infections that develop during pregnancy may trigger spontaneous abortion or affect typical fetal growth and development. Several infections that are notably associated with pregnancy include Group B streptococcus, Bacterial vaginosis, yeast infections, and Zika virus. Some of these infections may be rare but are associated with significant infant morbidity and mortality, particularly if the infection spreads throughout the fetal nervous system. Early evidence shows that COVID-19 gestational carrier infection in pregnancy may increase adverse outcomes such as preeclampsia. Furthermore, while the IUD is a highly effective method of birth control, pregnancies still occur on rare occasions. These pregnancies are notable for increased risks of miscarriage, preterm labor, placenta previa, placental abruption, chorioamnionitis and C-section deliveries. Removal of the IUD in the first trimester has been shown to decrease pregnancy complications and reduce the risks for preterm labor and miscarriage.

Different types of substance use and abuse may lead to high-risk pregnancies. The use of e-cigarettes in particular are associated with pregnancy risks. These risks include increased fetal and gestational parent morbidity and mortality, as well as fetal low birth weight and preterm births. Alcohol and marijuana use are associated with similar risks. Furthermore, medical neglect, irresponsibility, and violence leads to further pregnancy complications and risk factors. Discriminating against gestational carriers, practicing unethically, and close access to care are all associated with high-risk pregnancies. These actions make way for infant mortality and heightening pre-existing illnesses. Furthermore, medical neglect can cause risks factors in gestational carriers to be overlooked, thus leading to continued high-risk pregnancies.

Gestational carriers with a low socioeconomic status are associated with risks such as preeclampsia and preterm births. Individuals with lower socioeconomic statuses tend to live farther away from medical facilities, have less access to healthcare service, work longer hours, and have lower education levels.

== Management ==
Management of high-risk pregnancy is dependent on the specific etiology and situation of each particular pregnancy. Different risks require different modes of management.

To manage diabetes, self-monitoring using finger stick blood glucose monitoring is recommended. Medical nutritional therapy and insulin therapy, as well as anti-hyperglycemic oral medications are also recommended. Births should occur at healthcare centers, with the gestational carrier being aided by trained medical staff. Staff should be trained in advanced life support, as well. After birth, the gestational parent should have their blood glucose levels consistently monitored; any other tests should wait until there are signs of complications.

To manage chronic hypertension, Anti-hypertensive agents that are safe to use during pregnancy should be used. The American College of Obstetricians and Gynecologists (ACOG) also recommends low dose aspirin in gestational parents who have chronic hypertension and other pre-eclampsia risk factors.

The management of congenital defects in the fetus depends on the specific condition. For example, certain cardiac anomalies must be corrected to avoid irreversible damage during the gestational period, such as using fetal cardiac catheterization to correct pulmonary atresia with intact ventricular septum. Spina Bifida is another common condition that can be repaired before birth. Other anomalies, such as hypoplastic left heart syndrome, can be monitored throughout the pregnancy and treated with surgery soon after birth.

Furthermore, although conditions that are more common in multiple gestations, such as preterm birth, should be monitored properly during the pregnancy, there is currently limited evidence to evaluate the ability of specialized antenatal care on improving outcomes for the parent or infant.

To prevent infections, early and regular prenatal care is important. A provider should be consulted about options including prevention via medication prophylaxis or vaccines, and treatment such as appropriate use of antibiotics (ex. for congenital syphilis) or antifungals. Another option for prevention of transmission includes delivery via Caesarian delivery.

To avoid complications associated with substance use, educating gestational-parents about the risks of substance use during pregnancy helps to prevent associated risks. E-cigarettes are not a viable placeholder during pregnancy, as the use of them also leads to risks. The use of substances during pregnancy is highly discouraged and more public health campaigns are needed in order to educate on their dangers.

Modifying lifestyle factors is important in preventing risks associated with low socioeconomic status. Parental leave from work, general social interventions, social support, narrowing education gaps, and others barriers should be evaluated and narrowed in order to help prevent high-risk pregnancies. These changes can be made by institutions, such as places of employment, schools, religious institutions, and more.

=== Anxiety surrounding "high-risk pregnancy" label ===
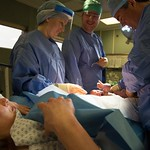
Cesarean section in action.

The concept of a high-risk pregnancy has been shown to elicit a strong emotional response in some pregnant women, including fear, anger, and guilt. In addition, some studies show that a pregnancy labeled "high-risk" may lead to more unnecessary testing than without the label, increasing these fears and reducing the gestational carrier's sense of control over the situation. Managing anxiety in pregnancies deemed high-risk has been deemed an important focus in research, although there is currently limited high-quality studies on the issue.

== High-Risk Pregnancy Specialists ==
Individuals with pre-existing medical conditions or who develop conditions or complications within pregnancy may be referred to a physician trained in managing high-risk pregnancies. These may include a maternal-fetal medicine specialist or MFM is an Obstetrician trained in managing complex and high-risk pregnancies, They are also known as Perinatologists or High-Risk OBGYNs, or Complex Family Planning Specialist. Complex Family Planning Specialists are OBGYNs trained in managing pregnancy in individuals or fetuses with complex health conditions. They are also specialists in contraception, unplanned pregnancies, and abortion care. Because of this, they may be consulted prior or during pregnancy for those with complex health needs. High-risk pregnancy specialists provide support, advice, and organize medical appointments and hospital stays.
