= Drugs in pregnancy =

Effects of drug consumption during pregnancy

Drugs, including medications and recreational drugs, may have effects during pregnancy on the pregnant woman and fetus that vary from the effects of the drug on people who are not pregnant. The Food and Drug Administration (FDA) in the United States reports that there are six million pregnancies with at least 50% of the women taking at least one medication. In addition a reported 5–10% of women of childbearing age use alcohol or other addictive substances. Of those who bear children, recreational drug use can have serious consequences to the health of not only the mother, but also the fetus as many medications can cross the placenta and reach the fetus. Some of the consequences on the babies include physical and mental abnormalities, higher risk of stillbirth, neonatal abstinence syndrome (NAS), sudden infant death syndrome (SIDS), low birthweight, and others.

Drugs taken in pregnancy including over-the counter-medications, prescription medications, nutritional supplements, recreational drugs, and illicit drugs may cause harm to the mother or the unborn child. Tobacco, alcohol, marijuana, and illicit drug use while pregnant may be dangerous for the unborn baby and may lead to severe health problems and/or birth defects. Even small amounts of alcohol, tobacco, and marijuana have not been proven to be safe when taken while pregnant. In some cases, for example, if the mother has epilepsy or diabetes, the risk of stopping a medication may be worse than risks associated with taking the medication while pregnant. The mother's healthcare professional will help make these decisions about the safest way to protect the health of both the mother and unborn child. In addition to medications and recreational substances, some dietary supplements are important for a healthy pregnancy, however, others may cause harm to the unborn child.

== Pregnancy categories ==
Categorizations of drugs based on safety in pregnancy varies by country.

Until 2014, the U.S. Code of Federal Regulations required that certain drugs and biological products be labelled specifically with respect to their effects on pregnant populations, including a definition of a "pregnancy category". These rules were enforced by the FDA, and medications that have been studied for their effects in pregnancy fell under the following Pregnancy Categories: A, B, C, D, or X depending on how they have been studied and what kind of results were found from the studies. In 2014, however, the FDA has developed a "Pregnancy and Lactation Labeling Rule (PLLR)" which requires product labels to include specific information related to the safety and effectiveness of medications to pregnant and lactating women. This ruling has removed the requirement of stating pregnancy categories in prescription drug labels.

Australia's categorization system takes into account birth defects, the effects around birth or when the mother gives birth, and problems that will arise later in the child's life due to the drug taken. The system places them into a category based on the severity of the consequences that the drug can have on the infant when it crosses the placenta.

== Medications ==
Medications during pregnancy must be carefully considered. Many drugs, medications, and nutritional supplements can affect fetal development or cause complications. For over-the-counter and prescription medications, healthcare professionals can help weigh the potential risks and benefits of taking medication while pregnant and if it is needed. Some medications may be necessary for the health and well being of both the mother and the unborn child, and some medications may come with a risk of harm to the unborn baby, but in some instances the benefits may outweigh the risks to the baby or mother.

=== Medications for pain ===
Short-term use of acetaminophen as directed is one of the only medications recommended for treating pain and fever in women who are pregnant. There is no established association with teratogenicity or elevated occurrence of birth defects and the usage of acetaminophen at any point during a pregnancy. There is potential for fetal liver toxicity in cases of maternal overdose, where the mother consumes more than the recommended daily dose.

Ibuprofen and naproxen have not frequently been studied during pregnancy, but recent studies do not show increased risk of spontaneous abortion within the first six weeks of pregnancy. However, all NSAIDs showed association with structural cardiac defects with usage during the early weeks of pregnancy. When ibuprofen and naproxen are used within the third trimester, there is a significant increase in the risk of premature closure of the ductus arteriosus with primary pulmonary hypertension in the newborn. Between the lack of studies of the effect of ibuprofen and naproxen on pregnancy, it is recommended that pregnant women avoid these medications or use them sparingly per physician recommendations.

Usage of aspirin for pain relief during pregnancy is not recommended. Aspirin use during pregnancy has not demonstrated an increased risk of spontaneous abortion within the early weeks of pregnancy. However, its usage during organogenesis and the third trimester can lead to elevated risk of intrauterine growth retardation and maternal hemorrhage.

While aspirin should be avoided for use pain relief, low dose aspirin is used for prevention of preeclampsia and fetal growth restriction (FGR) in patients with previous risk factors (e.g. previous preeclampsia, multiple pregnancies, hypertension and diabetes).

==== Pain medications containing opioids ====
For more information, see the below section on Recreational drugs

Pregnant women who use prescription medications containing opioids while pregnant may cause serious harm to the mother or unborn child. For some people, the risk of stopping a medication such as prescription opioids may be more serious than the risk of taking a medication.

=== Anticonvulsant medications ===
Many commonly prescribed anticonvulsant medications are associated with an increased risk of birth defects such as neural tube defects, however, most women with epilepsy deliver healthy babies and have a healthy pregnancy. Women who have epilepsy often still require treatment to control or prevent seizures and therefore require very early advice (ideally before conceiving the child) from their doctor to determine the safest way to protect both the mother and unborn child.

Valproic acid and its derivatives such as sodium valproate and divalproex sodium, commonly used to prevent seizures and treat mood disorders, increase the risk of congenital malformations (birth defects) including neural tube defects if taken during pregnancy. There is evidence that an increased dose or increased exposure in utero is associated with an increased risk of lower scores on neurodevelopmental tests. Valproic acid use during pregnancy increases the risk of neural tube defects by approximately 20-fold. Evidence is conflicting for carbamazepine regarding any increased risk of congenital physical anomalies or neurodevelopmental disorders by intrauterine exposure. Similarly, children exposed to lamotrigine or phenytoin in the womb do not seem to differ in their skills compared to those who were exposed to carbamazepine.

=== Antacids ===
Heartburn is a common symptom of late term pregnancy during which up to 80% of pregnant women have experienced it by the end of their third trimester. Heartburn often indicates the development of gastro-esophageal reflux disease (GERD), where the lower esophageal sphincter relaxes due to elevated progesterone levels causing increased frequency and severity of gastric reflux or heartburn. If heartburn appears after 20 weeks of gestational age or is severe and persistent, this can indicate other conditions including HELLP syndrome and preeclampsia.

Common antacids include aluminum hydroxide/magnesium hydroxide (Maalox) and calcium carbonate (Tums). Histamine H2 blockers and proton pump inhibitors, such as famotidine (Pepcid) and omeprazole (Prilosec), respectively, can also be used to help relieve heartburn, with no known teratogenic effects or congenital malformations. Aluminum hydroxide/magnesium hydroxide and calcium carbonate, when consumed, do not cross the placenta and are regarded as safe pharmacological options to treat heartburn, since there are no significant association with maldevelopment or injury to fetus.

Ginger and acupressure are common non-pharmacological options used to treat nausea and vomiting as alternatives to antacids, histamine H2 blockers, and proton pump inhibitors. Lifestyle modifications are often recommended as well. Recommended modifications can include avoiding fatty food, reducing size and frequency of meals, and reducing caffeine intake.

=== Antiacne ===
Acne vulgaris (acne) can occur in pregnancy possibly due to the hormonal changes influencing sebum production. There are limited antiacne medications that are safe in pregnancy. External applications of azelaic acid, glycolic acid, or benzoyl peroxide (alone or combined with clindamycin or erythromycin) are the safest options to treat mild to moderate acne. Erythromycin is the antibiotic of choice for severe acne, barring the use of its estolate salt which risks maternal hepatotoxicity. Topical nicotinamide and topical zinc are safe, however, there are no FDA pregnancy category ratings. Topical salicylic acid and topical dapsone are classified as FDA pregnancy category C. Acne medications to avoid during pregnancy include oral isotretinoin and topical tazarotene as there have been reports of birth defects. As safety data is lacking, the use of topical retinoids, such as adapalene and tretinoin, is not recommended. Antiandrogenic drugs, including spironolactone and cyproterone acetate, should be avoided. If planning to conceive while using contraindicated medications, a washout and waiting period before conception is advised. A herbal product, vitex agnus-castus should not be used during gestation due to undesirable hormonal effects.

Safety data supports the use of blue and red light therapy as non-drug treatments to consider. Personal hygiene and a healthy lifestyle also help, however dietary restriction and abrasive agents found in facial cleaning products are not beneficial. As there are limited options to safely treat acne in pregnancy, shared decision-making between the health care provider and client is recommended.

=== Anticoagulants ===
Anticoagulants are medications that prevent the blood from forming clots and are also known as blood thinners. These medications are commonly used for both prevention and treatment in people who are at risk for or have experienced a heart attack, stroke, or venous thromboembolism. Pregnancy increases the risk of clot formation in women due to elevated levels of certain clotting factors and compounds in the body, and the risk increases even more immediately after birth and remains elevated up to 3 months after delivery. Anticoagulants must be prescribed with caution as these medications can have negative health consequences for the developing baby and need to consider dosing and medication management options.

Warfarin (brand name Coumadin) is a commonly prescribed blood thinner both in the inpatient and outpatient hospital settings. In pregnant women, warfarin is contraindicated and should be avoided as it crosses the placental barrier. Additionally, warfarin is listed as Pregnancy Category D, which means it has a risk of harming the fetus. However, it has been shown that daily warfarin doses up to 5 mg may be beneficial for pregnant women who are at higher risk of thromboembolism.

A common low molecular weight heparin drug is called enoxaparin (brand name Lovenox). Enoxaparin is listed as Pregnancy Category B, meaning animal studies have failed to show harmful effects to the fetus and therefore are safe to use in pregnant women. However, pregnant women taking LMWH may not experience the full anticoagulant effect due to the nature of the medication compared to other anticoagulants (i.e. warfarin) and may be less favorable for users as it is an injectable medication.

Unfractionated heparin is another type of anticoagulant that has been widely used. UFH is classified as Pregnancy Category C, which means animal studies have shown potential for adverse effects to the fetus; however, there needs to be more studies done to confirm the presence of a risk to the fetus. UFH can be used in pregnant women as long as the benefits outweigh the risk.

Direct oral anticoagulants (DOACs) are newer types of anticoagulants that are available as oral medications and are widely used in non-pregnant populations. As many studies looking at DOACs exclude pregnant women, there is not enough evidence to demonstrate the safety and efficacy of DOACs in pregnant women. Currently, rivaroxaban (Xarelto), dabigatran (Pradaxa), and edoxaban (Savaysa) are DOACs listed under Pregnancy Category C, and apixaban (Eliquis) is listed under Pregnancy Category B.

=== Antidepressants ===
SSRI use in pregnancy has been associated with a variety of risks with varying degrees of proof of causation. As depression is independently associated with negative pregnancy outcomes, determining the extent to which observed associations between antidepressant use and specific adverse outcomes reflect a causative relationship has been difficult in some cases. In other cases, the attribution of adverse outcomes to antidepressant exposure seems fairly clear.

SSRI use in pregnancy is associated with an increased risk of spontaneous abortion of about 1.7-fold, and is associated with preterm birth and low birth weight.

A systematic review of the risk of major birth defects in antidepressant-exposed pregnancies found a small increase (3% to 24%) in the risk of major malformations and a risk of cardiovascular birth defects that did not differ from non-exposed pregnancies. A study of fluoxetine-exposed pregnancies found a 12% increase in the risk of major malformations that did not reach statistical significance. Other studies have found an increased risk of cardiovascular birth defects among depressed mothers not undergoing SSRI treatment, suggesting the possibility of ascertainment bias, e.g. that worried mothers may pursue more aggressive testing of their infants. Another study found no increase in cardiovascular birth defects and a 27% increased risk of major malformations in SSRI exposed pregnancies. The FDA advises for the risk of birth defects with the use of paroxetine and the MAOI should be avoided.

A 2013 systematic review and meta-analysis found that antidepressant use during pregnancy was statistically significantly associated with some pregnancy outcomes, such as gestational age and preterm birth, but not with other outcomes. The same review cautioned that because differences between the exposed and unexposed groups were small, it was doubtful whether they were clinically significant.

A neonate (infant less than 28 days old) may experience a withdrawal syndrome from abrupt discontinuation of the antidepressant at birth. Antidepressants can be present in varying amounts in breast milk, but their effects on infants are currently unknown.

Moreover, SSRIs inhibit nitric oxide synthesis, which plays an important role in setting the vascular tone. Several studies have pointed to an increased risk of prematurity associated with SSRI use, and this association may be due to an increased risk of pre-eclampsia during pregnancy.

=== Antidiabetics ===
Women who have diabetes mellitus may need intensive therapy with insulin to prevent complications to the mother and baby. Gestational diabetes is a form of diabetes that is first diagnosed during pregnancy and can accordingly cause high blood sugar that affects the woman and the baby. In 10-20% of women whose diet and exercise are not adequate enough to control blood sugar, insulin injections may be required to lower blood sugar levels. Medications that can be used in diabetes during pregnancy include insulin, glyburide and metformin.

=== Antidiarrheal ===
Diarrhea is not a common symptom of pregnancy; however, it can occur as a result of reduced gastric acidity and slowed intestinal motility. Bismuth subsalicylate (Pepto-Bismol), loperamide (Imodium), and atropine/diphenoxylate (Lomotil) are antidiarrheal agents that can be used to treat diarrhea. However, not all of them are safe to use during pregnancy. One of the components of bismuth subsalicylate is salicylate, which is a component that crosses the placenta. Due to this, there is an increased risk for intrauterine growth retardation, fetal hemorrhage, and maternal hemorrhage within organogenesis and in the second/third trimester. Loperamide has limited data on the impact it has on pregnancy, but there is an association with cardiovascular malformation in the first trimester. Atropine/diphenoxylate currently has insufficient evidence of teratogenicity in humans, but trials with animals showed evidence of teratogenic effects.

=== Antihistamines ===
Antihistamines may be prescribed in early pregnancy for the treatment of nausea and vomiting along with symptoms of asthma and allergies. First generation antihistamines include diphenhydramine (Benadryl), chlorpheniramine (Diabetic Tussin), hydroxyzine (Atarax), and doxepin (Sinequan). Second generation antihistamines include loratadine (Claritin), cetrizine (Zyrtec), and fexofenadine (Allegra). First generation antihistamines have the ability to cross the blood-brain barrier which can result in sedative and anticholinergic effects while effectively treating allergic reactions and nausea and vomiting related to pregnancy. On the other hand, second generation antihistamines do not cross the blood-brain barrier, thus eliminating sedating effects. Currently, there is a lack of association between prenatal antihistamine exposure and birth defects.

Antihistamines during pregnancy have not been linked to birth defects; however, further research is necessary for some antihistamine medications to determine safety during pregnancy. It is suggested that women speak to their healthcare professionals before taking any over-the-counter or prescription medication while pregnant to ensure that there are no adverse health outcomes.

=== Anti-hypertensives ===
Hypertensive issues are the most common cardiovascular disorders during pregnancy, occurring within 5 to 10% of all pregnant females. Anti-hypertensives are blood pressure medications used to treat high blood pressure in pregnant women. This class of medication is commonly used to treat problems such as heart failure, heart attack, and kidney failure. Caution must be exercised with the use of various hypertensive agents for the treatment of blood pressure. While the drug classes of Angiotensin Converting Enzyme inhibitors (ACEi), Angiotensin Receptor Blockers (ARB), and angiotensin receptor neprilysin inhibitors (ARNI) have been shown to be potent anti-hypertensive agents, their use is advised against during pregnancy. ACEi and ARB have known fetotoxicities when used during the second or third trimester or both. Signs and symptoms of ACEi and ARB use during pregnancy include kidney damage or failure, oligohydramnios, anuria, joint contractures, and hypoplasia of the skull. Common, alternative agents for high blood pressure in pregnant women include anti-adrenergic and beta-blocking medications, such as methyldopa or metoprolol, respectively.

=== Decongestants ===
Decongestants are often used in conjunction with cold medications or to combat pregnancy rhinitis in pregnant women. Common decongestants include pseudoephedrine and phenylephrine. Pseudoephedrine is an alpha-adrenergic receptor agonist that enacts a vasoconstrictive effect to reduce airflow resistance in the nasal cavity and allow easier breathing by relieving a stuffy or congested nose. When taken in early trimesters, there has been limited evidence to associate pseudoephedrine with birth defects. However, studies often found it difficult to isolate pseudoephedrine's involvement, due to the variety of combination products that contain pseudoephedrine in conjunction with other medications. Since pseudoephedrine activates alpha adrenergic receptors, it has the ability to elevate blood pressure and cause vasoconstriction within the uterine arteries. This can negatively affect blood flow to the fetus. Due to the lack of studies, decongestants in combination drugs or isolated forms are suggested to be used sparingly during pregnancy. Saline nasal sprays, among other non-pharmacological treatments, are considered to be safe alternatives for decongestants.

== Dietary supplements ==
Dietary supplements such as folic acid and iron are important for a healthy pregnancy. Some dietary supplements can cause side effects and harm to the mother or unborn child. Pregnant women should discuss all dietary supplements with their health care professional to determine the appropriate dosage and which supplements are safe during pregnancy.

Caution should be taken before consuming dietary supplements while pregnant as dietary supplements are considered "foods" rather than medications and are not regulated for safety and efficacy by the FDA.

=== Folic Acid ===
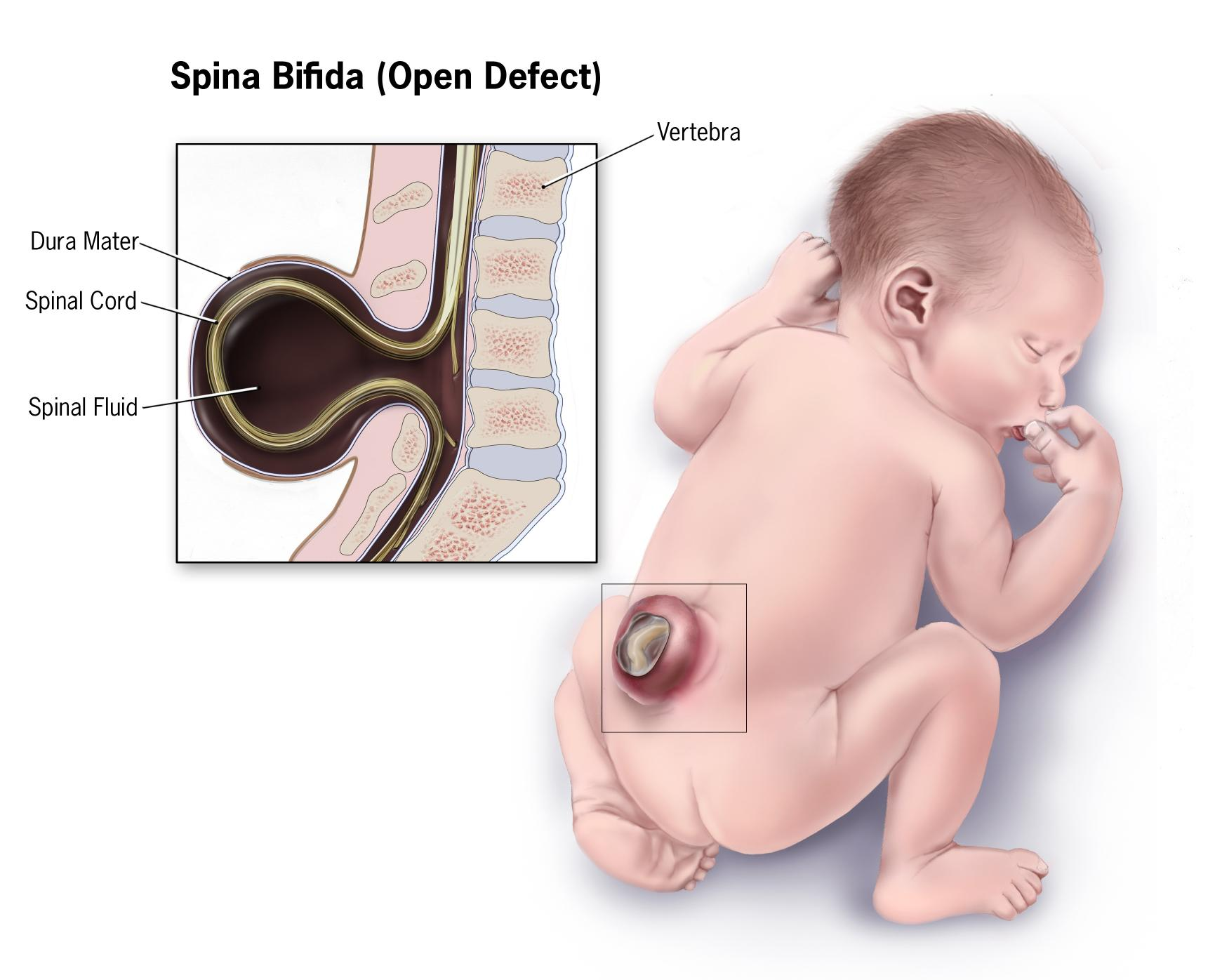
Example of a neural tube defect: Spina Bifida

Many countries such as the USA, Canada, Chile, and Costa Rica have fortified foods with folic acid and have seen a reduced incidence of neural tube defect (NTD).

The Center for Disease Control and Prevention (CDC) recommends that all women of child-barring age receive 400 μg of folic acid supplement (even if they are not planning on getting pregnant). Women who have already had an NTD-affected pregnancy and are planning to become pregnant again should receive 4000 μg each day for a month before and for the first three months of pregnancy. The recommendation came from a study conducted by the British Medical Research Council (MRC) Vitamin Study Group from July 1983 to April 1991 involving 33 centers (17 of which in the UK and the remaining 16 in 6 different countries) that compared pregnancy outcomes of folic acid and other vitamins interventions with placebo. That study found a risk reduction of 71% of NTD-affected pregnancies in groups receiving folic acid when compared to groups receiving placebo. In the study, there were four intervention groups, Group A received 4 mg of folic acid; Group B received a multivitamin that contained folic acid; Group C placebo and Group D received a multivitamin without folic acid. In the groups that received folic acid, 6 out of 593 (1%) infants and fetuses had NTD reoccurrence compared to the groups that received no folic acid, which had 21 infants and fetuses with NTD out of 602 (3.5%). There were no significant benefit found in the vitamin intervention groups.

=== Iron ===
Iron deficiency is common in pregnancy, with the highest occurrence rate during the third trimester as iron demand increases to support the placenta, fetal development and the iron stores for the first six months after birth. Low iron levels can cause fatigue, reduced work capacity, cardiovascular stress, lower resistance to infection and iron deficiency anemia. Iron deficiency anemia in pregnancy can lead to an increased risk of premature delivery, low birth weight and increased risk of perinatal mortality.

The Recommended Dietary Allowance (RDA) suggests 27 mg of iron a day which would account for normal iron losses, iron used by the fetus and related tissues during gestation and increased maternal hemoglobin mass changes. WHO recommends taking supplements of 30–60 mg of elemental iron a day throughout pregnancy for all pregnant individuals. Iron demand depends on individual specific factors and risk of deficiency; for specific dose recommendations, individuals should discuss with their doctors.

Dietary sources of iron include meat, poultry, fish, eggs, legumes, vegetables, fruits, grains, nuts and iron-fortified grain products. Eating at least one source of vitamin C with each meal is also recommended, as it can help increase iron absorption. Examples of vitamin C sources include broccoli, cantaloupe, citrus fruits and their juices, kiwis, mangos, potatoes, strawberries, sweet peppers, tomatoes, and tomato sauce. On the contrary, caffeine, calcium supplements and antacids should be separated from meals and iron supplements by 1–2 hours as they can decrease iron absorption.

== Illicit and recreational drugs ==
According to the World Health Organization, substance abuse refers to the damaging or risky consumption of psychoactive substances, which includes alcohol and illegal drugs. When pregnant women use psychotropic substances, whether they are prescribed or not, it can have adverse effects on the developing fetus. These effects may include causing birth defects, delayed development, and intrauterine growth restriction. Additionally, it raises the likelihood of various pregnancy complications, including spontaneous miscarriage, preterm birth, and puts the mother at an increased risk of medical issues such as postpartum bleeding and placental abruption.

=== Alcohol ===
Alcohol should not be consumed while pregnant. Even a small amount of alcohol is not known to be safe for the unborn baby. Alcohol passes easily from the mother's bloodstream through the placenta and into the bloodstream of the fetus. Since the fetus is smaller and does not have a fully developed liver, the concentration of alcohol in its bloodstream lasts longer, increasing the chances of detrimental side effects. The severity of effects alcohol may have on a developing fetus depends upon the amount and frequency of alcohol consumed; maternal weight, age, and alcohol metabolism; and the stage of pregnancy.

==== Fetal alcohol spectrum disorder ====
Heavy drinking and binge drinking are closely associated with a higher risk of fetal alcohol spectrum disorders (FASDs). The most severe form of FASD is fetal alcohol syndrome (FAS). This used to be the only diagnosis for fetal disorders due to alcohol consumption, but the term was broadened to a "spectrum" due to the variety of abnormalities observed in newborns. This was most likely because of the different amounts of alcohol ingested during pregnancy indicating that there is not a clear, specific dose that determines if a fetus will be affected by alcohol or not. FAS is characterized by slower physical growth, distinct facial abnormalities including smooth philtrum, thin vermilion, and short palpebral fissures, neurological deficits, or smaller head circumference.Other problems associated with FASD include delayed or uncoordinated motor skills, hearing or vision problems, learning disabilities, behavior problems, and inappropriate social skills compared to same-age peers. Those affected are more likely to have trouble in school, legal problems, participate in high-risk behaviors, and develop substance use disorders themselves.

==== Miscarriage ====
Alcohol consumption is a risk factor for miscarriage.

==== Neonatal withdrawal ====
Babies exposed to alcohol, benzodiazepines, barbiturates, and some antidepressants (SSRIs) during pregnancy may experience neonatal withdrawal.

The onset of clinical presentation typically appears within 48 to 72 hours of birth but may take up to 8 days.

==== Sudden infant death syndrome ====
Drinking of alcohol by parents is linked to sudden infant death syndrome (SIDS). One study found a positive correlation between the two during New Years celebrations and weekends. Another found that alcohol use disorder was linked to a more than doubling of risk.

=== Caffeine ===
Caffeine is a widespread drug consumed by adults due to its behavioral and stimulating effects. According to the American College of Obstetricians and Gynecologists, an acceptable intake of caffeine for pregnant women is less than or equal to 200 mg per day. Consumption of caffeine is not associated with adverse reproductive and developmental effects. The half-life of caffeine is longer in pregnancy by 8 to 16 more hours, which means that caffeine stays in the person longer, increases fetal exposure to caffeine, and is eliminated slower in the body. Other comprehensive reviews reported that caffeine intake of more than 300 mg per day have been associated with spontaneous abortions and low birth weight, but further research is needed to establish this causal relationship. Women with morning sickness are less likely to miscarry and more likely to have aversions to caffeinated beverages like coffee, which may indicate reverse causation.

=== Cannabis ===
Cannabis use during pregnancy should be avoided. There is no known safe dose of cannabis while pregnant and use of cannabis may lead to birth defects, pre-term birth, or low birth weight. Tetrahydrocannabinol (THC), an active ingredient in cannabis, can both cross the placenta and accumulates in high concentrations in breast milk. Cannabis consumption in pregnancy might be associated with restrictions in growth of the fetus, miscarriage, and cognitive deficits. Infants exposed to prenatal cannabis may show signs of increased tremors and altered sleep patterns. Cannabis is the most frequently used illicit drug amongst pregnant women. There are significant limitations to the current research available. One limitation is because most studies done are dated in the 1980s. Additionally, many studies done on cannabis that evaluate its safety often fail to account for confounding factors, a variable that could also be having an effect on an outcome that is not the test variable. For example, tobacco use and sociodemographic differences are often not adjusted for accordingly in many studies.

=== Cocaine ===
Use of cocaine in pregnant women is dangerous and can lead to cardiovascular complications like hypertension, myocardial infarction and ischemia, kidney failure, liver rupture, cerebral ischemia, cerebral infarction, and maternal death. Cardiac muscles become more sensitive to cocaine in pregnancy, in the presence of increasing progesterone concentrations. Cocaine use leads to increased risk for perinatal outcomes: preterm delivery, low birth weight (less than 2500 grams) or reduced birth rate, small size and earlier gestational age at delivery.

Prenatal cocaine exposure (PCE) is associated with premature birth, birth defects, attention deficit hyperactivity disorder (ADHD), and other conditions.

=== Methamphetamine ===
Use of methamphetamine is dangerous for pregnant women and to the fetus. Methamphetamines are a class of drugs that provide stimulant-like effects, including euphoria and alertness. The drug crosses the placenta and affects the fetus during the gestational stage of pregnancy. Methamphetamine use in pregnancy may lead to babies born with an earlier gestational age at delivery (pre-term), lower birth weight, and smaller head circumference. Methamphetamine use during pregnancy also negatively impacts brain development and behavioral functioning and increases the risk of the baby having ADHD and lower mental processing speed.

=== Opioids ===
Opioids such as heroin, fentanyl, oxycodone and methadone should not be taken while pregnant. Opioid use during pregnancy may cause adverse outcomes for the women and unborn child. Women who use opioids during pregnancy in a non-medical fashion are at a higher risk for premature birth, lower birth weight, still birth, specific birth defects, and withdrawal (neonatal abstinence syndrome).

Opioids can cross the placenta and the blood brain barrier to the fetus. Opioid use is the main cause of neonatal abstinence syndrome, which is where the baby experiences withdrawals from the opioid they were exposed to during the pregnancy. Typical symptoms may include tremors, convulsions, twitching, excessive crying, poor feeding or sucking, slow weight gain, breathing problems, fever, diarrhea, and vomiting. There is no consensus on the effects on cognitive abilities. Further research is required to determine the long-term effects of in utero exposure to opioid medications on children.

=== Tobacco ===
Smoking during pregnancy is dangerous to the unborn baby and may cause pre-term birth, birth defects such as cleft lip or cleft palate, or miscarriage. Tobacco is the most commonly used substance among pregnant women, at 25%. Nicotine crosses the placenta and accumulates within fetal tissues. Children born to women who smoked heavily were more susceptible to behavioral problems such as ADHD, poor impulse control, and aggressive behaviors. Tobacco contains carbon monoxide, which has the potential to prevent the fetus from receiving sufficient oxygen. Other health concerns tobacco poses are premature birth, low birth weight, and an increased risk of sudden infant death syndrome (SIDS) of up to three times compared to infants not exposed to tobacco. Smoking and pregnancy, combined, cause twice the risk of premature rupture of membranes, placental abruption and placenta previa. In addition to the fetus, women in general who smoke heavily are less likely to become pregnant.
