= Pre-existing disease in pregnancy =

A pre-existing disease in pregnancy is a disease that is not directly caused by the pregnancy, in contrast to various complications of pregnancy, but which may become worse or be a potential risk to the pregnancy (such as causing pregnancy complications). A major component of this risk can result from the necessary use of drugs in pregnancy to manage the disease.

In such circumstances, women who wish to continue with a pregnancy require extra medical care, often from an interdisciplinary team. Such a team might include (besides an obstetrician) a specialist in the disorder and other practitioners (for example, maternal-fetal specialists or obstetric physicians, dieticians, etc.).

== Cardiovascular problems ==
=== Chronic hypertension ===
Chronic hypertension in pregnancy can lead to increased complications for both the mother and fetus. Maternal complications include superimposed pre-eclampsia and caesarean delivery. Fetal complications include preterm delivery, low birth weight, and death. Increasing rates of obesity and metabolic syndrome play a key role in the increased prevalence of chronic hypertension and associated complications. Women who have chronic hypertension before their pregnancy are at increased risk of complications such as premature birth, low birthweight or stillbirth. Women who have high blood pressure and had complications in their pregnancy have three times the risk of developing cardiovascular disease compared to women with normal blood pressure who had no complications in pregnancy. Monitoring pregnant women's blood pressure can help prevent both complications and future cardiovascular diseases. While high blood pressure treatment has been shown to decrease the incidence of severe hypertension during pregnancy, there was no significant difference in pregnancy complications (for example, superimposed pre-eclampsia, stillbrith/neonatal death, small for gestational age).

=== Hypercoagulability ===
Hypercoagulability in pregnancy is the propensity of pregnant women to develop thrombosis (blood clots), such as a deep vein thrombosis with a potential subsequent pulmonary embolism. Pregnancy itself is a factor of hypercoagulability (pregnancy-induced hypercoagulability), as a physiologically adaptive mechanism to prevent postpartum bleeding. The pregnancy-associated hypercoagulability is attributed to an increased synthesis of coagulation factors, such as fibrinogen, by the liver through the effects of estrogen.

When combined with any additional underlying hypercoagulable state, the risk of thrombosis or embolism may become substantial. Multiple pre-existing genetic disorders can worsen the hypercoagulable state observed in pregnancy. Examples include:

- Factor V Leiden
- Prothrombin G20210A
- Protein C deficiency
- Protein S deficiency
- Antithrombin III deficiency

=== Valvular heart disease ===
In the case of valvular heart disease in pregnancy, the maternal physiological changes in pregnancy confer additional load on the heart and may lead to complications.

In individuals who require an artificial heart valve, consideration must be made for deterioration of the valve over time (for bioprosthetic valves) versus the risks of blood clotting in pregnancy with mechanical valves with the resultant need of drugs in pregnancy in the form of anticoagulants.

== Endocrine disorders ==
=== Diabetes mellitus ===
Diabetes mellitus and pregnancy deals with the interactions of diabetes mellitus (not restricted to gestational diabetes) and pregnancy. Risks for the child include miscarriage, growth restriction, growth acceleration, fetal obesity (macrosomia), polyhydramnios, and birth defects.

=== Thyroid disease ===
Thyroid disease in pregnancy can, if uncorrected, cause adverse effects on fetal and maternal well-being. The deleterious effects of thyroid dysfunction can also extend beyond pregnancy and delivery to affect neurointellectual development in the early life of the child. Demand for thyroid hormones is increased during pregnancy, which may cause a previously unnoticed thyroid disorder to worsen. The most effective way of screening for thyroid dysfunction is not known. A review found that more women were diagnosed with thyroid dysfunction when all pregnant women were tested instead of just testing those at 'high-risk' of thyroid problems (those with family history, signs or symptoms). Finding more women with thyroid dysfunction meant that the women could have treatment and management through their pregnancies. However, the outcomes of the pregnancies were surprisingly similar, so more research is needed to look at the effects of screening all pregnant women for thyroid problems.

== Neurological problems ==
=== Epilepsy ===
Women with epilepsy usually have safe, healthy pregnancies and healthy babies. However, achieving this requires choosing appropriate anti-seizure medications to maintain seizure control while reducing the risk of birth defects caused by the medications. Unplanned pregnancies should be prevented, and pregnancies should be planned up to a year in advance, to allow time to switch to anti-seizure medications that are safer for the baby. Seizures during pregnancy can cause birth defects or pregnancy loss, so anti-seizure medications normally need to be taken during pregnancy. For example, valproic acid is not recommended during pregnancy because of the higher risk of neurodevelopmental birth defects compared to other medications, so a woman who has been taking valproic acid might try a different medication. Even if anti-seizure medications are not taken, the child has a somewhat increased risk of developing epilepsy, though the overall absolute risk of the child developing epilepsy is usually around 5%.

== Infections ==
=== Vertically transmitted infections ===
Many infectious diseases have a risk of vertical transmission to the fetus, known as TORCH infections. Examples based on the TORCHES acronym include:

- Toxoplasma
- Other: Parvovirus B19, Zika, Chickenpox
- Rubella
- Cytomegalovirus
- Herpes simplex or Neonatal herpes simplex
- HIV
- Syphilis

Infections in pregnancy also raise particular concerns about whether or not to use drugs in pregnancy (that is, antibiotics or antivirals) to treat them. For example, pregnant women who contract H1N1 influenza infection are recommended to receive antiviral therapy with either oseltamivir (which is the preferred medication) or zanamivir. Both amantadine and rimantadine have been found to be teratogenic and embryotoxic when given at high doses in animal studies.

=== Candidal vulvovaginitis ===
In pregnancy, changes in the levels of female sex hormones, such as estrogen, make a woman more likely to develop candidal vulvovaginitis. During pregnancy, the Candida fungus is more prevalent (common), and recurrent infection is also more likely. There is no clear evidence that treatment of asymptomatic candidal vulvovaginitis in pregnancy reduces the risk of preterm birth. Candidal vulvovaginitis in pregnancy should be treated with intravaginal clotrimazole or nystatin for at least 7 days.

=== Bacterial vaginosis ===
Bacterial vaginosis is an imbalance of naturally occurring bacterial flora in the vagina. Bacterial vaginosis occurring during pregnancy may increase the risk of pregnancy complications, most notably premature birth or miscarriage. However, this risk is small overall and appears more significant in women who have had such complications in an earlier pregnancy.

== Other autoimmune disorders ==
=== Celiac disease ===
Untreated celiac disease can cause spontaneous abortion (miscarriage), intrauterine growth restriction, small for gestational age, low birthweight and preterm birth. Often, reproductive disorders are the only manifestation of undiagnosed celiac disease, and most cases are not recognized. Complications or failures of pregnancy cannot be explained simply by malabsorption, but by the autoimmune response elicited by the exposure to gluten, which causes damage to the placenta. The gluten-free diet avoids or reduces the risk of developing reproductive disorders in pregnant women with celiac disease. Also, pregnancy can be a trigger for the development of celiac disease in genetically susceptible women who are consuming gluten.

=== Systemic lupus erythematosus ===
Systemic lupus erythematosus and pregnancy confers an increased rate of fetal death in utero and spontaneous abortion (miscarriage), as well as of neonatal lupus.

=== Behçet's disease ===
Pregnancy does not worsen the course of Behçet's disease and may ameliorate it. Still, there is substantial variability in clinical course between patients and even for different pregnancies in the same patient. Also, the other way around, Behçet's disease confers an increased risk of pregnancy complications, miscarriage and Cesarean section.

=== Multiple sclerosis ===
Being pregnant decreases the risk of relapse in multiple sclerosis; however, during the first months after delivery, the risk increases. Overall, pregnancy does not seem to influence long-term disability. Multiple sclerosis does not increase the risk of congenital abnormality or miscarriage.

== Mental health ==
=== Depression in pregnancy ===
The effects of depression during pregnancy are difficult to parse from depression before pregnancy, as the symptoms of the two overlap. However, the biggest risk factor for depression during pregnancy is a prior history of depression. Most of the research is focused on the consequences of untreated depression regardless if the depression developed during pregnancy or if it was there before conception. Untreated depression has been linked to premature birth, low birth weight, fetal growth restriction, and postnatal complications. On the other hand, however, anti-depressant medications also come with a small risk of pre-term birth, low birth weight, and persistent pulmonary hypertension.

== Respiratory disease ==
=== Asthma ===
In the United States, the prevalence of asthma among pregnant women is between 8.4% and 8.8%. Asthma in pregnant women is strongly associated with multiple adverse health outcomes, including pre-eclampsia, preterm birth, and low birth weight. Other conditions such as gestational diabetes, placenta previa, and hemorrhage are inconsistently correlated to asthma. Additionally, women with Asthma face a higher likelihood of complications during labor and delivery, such as breech presentation and caesarean delivery. Poorly controlled and severe asthma may exacerbate conditions associated with maternal and neonate morbidity and mortality. Asthma treatment recommendations during pregnancy are similar to those in non-pregnant women.

As of 2018, Asthma was the most prevalent respiratory disorder to complicate pregnancy, remaining a high-risk condition despite therapeutic advancements. Preventing asthma exacerbations during pregnancy is crucial to reduce the risk of complications and poor outcomes.

==== The course of asthma during pregnancy ====
The course of asthma during pregnancy can vary, with some patients experiencing worsening symptoms while others see improvement.

As of 2006, it was believed the course of asthma during pregnancy varied with a similar proportion of women improving, remaining stable, or worsening. However, as of 2013, it was found that deterioration may manifest in approximately 20% of women, improvement in around 30%, and no significant change observed in the remaining 50%.

== Structural (congenital) abnormalities of the uterus ==
Structural abnormalities of the uterus include conditions like a septate uterus, a bicornuate uterus, an arcuate uterus, and a didelphys uterus. Most of these abnormalities occur when the Müllerian ducts are fused improperly or incompletely. Women with these congenital abnormalities are usually unaware, as these conditions do not usually present any symptoms. During pregnancy, these conditions are associated with infertility, preterm birth, fetal malpresentation, and early miscarriages. Among these uterine abnormalities, those with canalization defects, i.e., not having a normal uterine canal, such as septate defects, have the worst pregnancy outcomes. Surgical treatment is only recommended for individuals who have had recurrent miscarriages and have a septate uterus; however, the risks of surgery, especially scarring of the womb, should be considered. Further evidence from randomized controlled trials is required to establish conclusively whether surgery is the better option when its risks and rewards are compared with the risks of adverse pregnancy outcomes.

== Others ==
The following conditions may also become worse or be a potential risk to the pregnancy:

- Cancer
- Chronic hypertension
- Cirrhosis
- Congenital disorders that may be passed on to offspring
- Heart defects, especially primary pulmonary hypertension and Eisenmenger's syndrome
- Kidney disorders
- Mental health.
  - Depression has been linked to higher rates of preterm delivery.
- Respiratory disorders and diseases (associated, for example, with placental abruption)
  - Asthma
- Seizure disorders
- Structural abnormalities in the cervix
- Structural abnormalities in the uterus
- Viral hepatitis
