= Lupus and pregnancy =

Health issue

Lupus and pregnancy can present some particular challenges for both mother and child.

While most infants born to mothers who have lupus are healthy, mothers with lupus as a pre-existing disease in pregnancy should remain under medical care until delivery. In general, women with lupus and, in addition, hypertension, proteinuria, and azotemia have an extra increased risk for pregnancy complications, including miscarriage, stillbirth, pre-eclampsia, preterm birth, and intrauterine growth restriction. Pregnancy outcomes in women with lupus who receive kidney transplants are similar to those of transplant recipients without lupus.

Women pregnant and known to have anti-Ro (SSA) or anti-La antibodies (SSB) often have echocardiograms during the 16th and 30th weeks of pregnancy to monitor the health of the heart and surrounding vasculature.

Contraception and other reliable forms of pregnancy prevention is routinely advised for women with lupus, since getting pregnant during active disease was found to be harmful. Lupus nephritis was the most common manifestation.

Of live births, approximately one third are delivered prematurely.

== Miscarriage ==
Lupus causes an increased rate of fetal death in utero and spontaneous abortion (miscarriage). The overall live-birth rate in somebody with lupus has been estimated to be 72%. Pregnancy outcome appears to be worse in those with lupus whose disease flares up during pregnancy.

Miscarriages in the first trimester appear either to have no known cause or to be associated with signs of active lupus. Later losses appear to occur primarily due to the antiphospholipid syndrome, in spite of treatment with heparin and aspirin. All women with lupus, even those without previous history of miscarriage, are recommended to be screened for antiphospholipid antibodies, both the lupus anticoagulant (the RVVT and sensitive PTT are the best screening battery) and anticardiolipin antibodies.

== Neonatal lupus ==
Neonatal lupus is the occurrence of lupus symptoms in an infant born from a mother with lupus, most commonly presenting with a rash resembling discoid lupus erythematosus, and sometimes with systemic abnormalities such as heart block or hepatosplenomegaly. Neonatal lupus is usually benign and self-limited. Still, identification of mothers at highest risk for complications allows for prompt treatment before or after birth. In addition, lupus can flare up during pregnancy, and proper treatment can maintain the health of the mother for longer.

== Aggravation of lupus ==
Aggravation (or exacerbation) of lupus has been estimated to occur in about 20-30% pregnancies where the mother has lupus. Increased disease activity of lupus is expected during pregnancy because of increased levels of estrogen, prolactin, and certain cytokines. However, a long time of remission before pregnancy decreases the risk of aggravation, with an incidence of 7-33% in women who have been in remission for at least 6 months, and an incidence of 61-67% in women who have active lupus at the time of conception.

Renal disease flare-up is the most common presentation of lupus aggravation in pregnancy, and is seen equally in United States and European populations. Serositis with pleural and pericardial effusions are seen in up to 10% of these patients.

On the other hand, flares of lupus are uncommon during pregnancy and are often easily treated. The most common symptoms of these flares include arthritis, rashes, and fatigue.

Also, in the postpartum period, there may be exacerbations of lupus due to decreased levels of anti-inflammatory steroids, elevated levels of prolactin and estrogen and progesterone changes.

In diagnosing an aggravation of lupus in pregnancy, there need to be a differential diagnosis from lupus-unrelated complications of pregnancy that may appear in a similar fashion. For example, chloasma may appear like the malar rash of lupus, proteinuria from preeclampsia may appear like that of lupus nephritis, thrombocytopenia of the HELLP syndrome may appear like that of lupus, and pregnancy-related edema of joints can appear like arthritis of lupus.

== General preventive measures ==
Continuing glucocorticoids at the lowest effective dose and/or cautious use of azathioprine may be preferred in some patients, but needs to be weighed against potential adverse effects of such medications.
