= Thyroid disease in pregnancy =

Potential health issue in pregnancy

Thyroid disease in pregnancy can affect the health of the mother as well as the child before and after delivery. Thyroid disorders are prevalent in women of childbearing age and for this reason commonly present as a pre-existing disease in pregnancy, or after childbirth. Uncorrected thyroid dysfunction in pregnancy has adverse effects on fetal and maternal well-being. The deleterious effects of thyroid dysfunction can also extend beyond pregnancy and delivery to affect neurointellectual development in the early life of the child. Due to an increase in thyroxine-binding globulin, an increase in placental type 3 deiodinase, and the placental transfer of maternal thyroxine to the fetus, the demand for thyroid hormones is increased during pregnancy. The necessary increase in thyroid hormone production is facilitated by high human chorionic gonadotropin (hCG) concentrations, which bind the TSH receptor and stimulate the maternal thyroid to increase maternal thyroid hormone concentrations by roughly 50%. If the necessary increase in thyroid function cannot be met, this may cause a previously unnoticed (mild) thyroid disorder to worsen and become evident as gestational thyroid disease. Currently, there is not enough evidence to suggest that screening for thyroid dysfunction is beneficial, especially since treatment with thyroid hormone supplementation may come with a risk of overtreatment. After women give birth, about 5% develop postpartum thyroiditis, which can occur up to nine months afterward. This is characterized by a short period of hyperthyroidism followed by a period of hypothyroidism; 20–40% remain permanently hypothyroid.

== The thyroid in pregnancy ==
Fetal thyroxine is wholly obtained from maternal sources in early pregnancy since the fetal thyroid gland only becomes functional in the second trimester of gestation. As thyroxine is essential for fetal neurodevelopment, maternal delivery of thyroxine to the fetus must be ensured early in gestation. In pregnancy, iodide losses through the urine and the feto-placental unit contribute to a state of relative iodine deficiency. Thus, pregnant women require additional iodine intake. A daily iodine intake of 250 μg is recommended in pregnancy, but this is not always achieved even in iodine-sufficient parts of the world.

Thyroid hormone concentrations in blood are increased in pregnancy, partly due to the high levels of estrogen and due to the weak thyroid-stimulating effects of human chorionic gonadotropin (hCG) that acts like TSH. Thyroxine (T4) levels rise from about 6–12 weeks and peak by mid-gestation; reverse changes are seen with TSH. Gestation-specific reference ranges for thyroid function tests are not widely in use, although many centres are now preparing them.

== Hypothyroidism ==
=== Clinical evaluation ===
Hypothyroidism is common in pregnancy with an estimated prevalence of 2-3% and 0.3-0.5% for subclinical and overt hypothyroidism, respectively. Endemic iodine deficiency accounts for most hypothyroidism in pregnant women worldwide while chronic autoimmune thyroiditis is the most common cause of hypothyroidism in iodine sufficient parts of the world. The presentation of hypothyroidism in pregnancy is not always classical and may sometimes be difficult to distinguish from the symptoms of normal pregnancy. A high index of suspicion is therefore required, especially in women at risk of thyroid disease, e.g. women with a personal or family history of thyroid disease, goitre, or co-existing primary autoimmune disorder like type 1 diabetes.

=== Risks of hypothyroidism on fetal and maternal well-being ===
Hypothyroidism is diagnosed by noting a high TSH associated with a subnormal T4 concentration. Subclinical hypothyroidism (SCH) is present when the TSH is high but the T4 level is in the normal range, but usually low normal. SCH is the most common form of hypothyroidism in pregnancy and is usually due to progressive thyroid destruction due to autoimmune thyroid disease.

Several studies, mostly retrospective, have shown an association between overt hypothyroidism and adverse fetal and obstetric outcomes (e.g., Glinoer 1991). Maternal complications such as miscarriages, anaemia in pregnancy, pre-eclampsia, abruptio placenta and postpartum haemorrhage can occur in pregnant women with overt hypothyroidism. Also, the offspring of these mothers can have complications such as premature birth, low birth weight and increased neonatal respiratory distress. Similar complications have been reported in mothers with subclinical hypothyroidism. A three-fold risk of placental abruption and a two-fold risk of pre-term delivery were reported in mothers with subclinical hypothyroidism. Another study showed a higher prevalence of subclinical hypothyroidism in women with pre-term delivery (before 32 weeks) compared to matched controls delivering at term. An association with adverse obstetric outcomes has also been demonstrated in pregnant women with thyroid autoimmunity independent of thyroid function. Treatment of hypothyroidism reduces the risks of these adverse obstetric and fetal outcomes; a retrospective study of 150 pregnancies showed that treatment of hypothyroidism led to reduced rates of abortion and premature delivery. Also, a prospective intervention trial study showed that treatment of euthyroid antibody-positive pregnant women led to lower rates of miscarriage than untreated controls.

It has long been known that cretinism (i.e., gross reduction in IQ) occurs in areas of severe iodine deficiency because the mother is unable to make T4 for transport to the fetus, particularly in the first trimester. This neurointellectual impairment (on a more modest scale) has now been shown in an iodine-sufficient area (USA) where a study showed that the IQ scores of 7- to 9-year-old children, born to mothers with undiagnosed and untreated hypothyroidism in pregnancy, were seven points lower than those of children of matched control women with normal thyroid function in pregnancy. Another study showed that persistent hypothyroxinaemia at 12 weeks gestation was associated with an 8-10 point deficit in mental and motor function scores in infant offspring compared to children of mothers with normal thyroid function. Even maternal thyroid peroxidase antibodies were shown to be associated with impaired intellectual development in the offspring of mothers with normal thyroid function. It has been shown that it is only the maternal FT4 levels that are associated with child IQ and brain morphological outcomes, as opposed to maternal TSH levels.

=== Management of hypothyroidism in pregnancy ===
Medications to treat hypothyroidism are safe during pregnancy. Levothyroxine is the treatment of choice for hypothyroidism in pregnancy. Thyroid function should be normalised before conception in women with pre-existing thyroid disease. Once pregnancy is confirmed, the thyroxine dose should be increased by about 30-50%, and subsequent titrations should be guided by thyroid function tests (FT4 and TSH) that should be monitored 4-6 weekly until euthyroidism is achieved. It is recommended that TSH levels are maintained below 2.5 mU/L in the first trimester of pregnancy and below 3 mU/L in later pregnancy. The recommended maintenance dose of thyroxine in pregnancy is about 2.0-2.4 μg/kg daily. Thyroxine requirements may increase in late gestation and return to pre-pregnancy levels in the majority of women on delivery. Pregnant patients with subclinical hypothyroidism (normal FT4 and elevated TSH) should be treated as well, since supplementation with levothyroxine in such cases results in a significantly higher delivery rate, with a pooled relative chance of 2.76.

== Hyperthyroidism ==
=== Clinical evaluation ===
Hyperthyroidism occurs in about 0.2-0.4% of all pregnancies. Most cases are due to Graves' disease, although less common causes (e.g. toxic nodules and thyroiditis) may be seen. Clinical assessment alone may occasionally be inadequate in differentiating hyperthyroidism from the hyperdynamic state of pregnancy. Distinctive clinical features of Graves' disease include the presence of ophthalmopathy, diffuse goitre, and pretibial myxoedema. Also, hyperthyroidism must be distinguished from gestational transient thyrotoxicosis, a self-limiting hyperthyroid state due to the thyroid stimulatory effects of beta-hCG. This distinction is important since the latter condition is typically mild and will not usually require specific antithyroid treatment. Red cell zinc may also be useful in differentiating the two. Hyperthyroidism due to Graves' disease may worsen in the first trimester of pregnancy, remit in later pregnancy, and subsequently relapse in the postpartum.

=== Risks of hyperthyroidism on fetal and maternal well-being ===
Uncontrolled hyperthyroidism in pregnancy is associated with an increased risk of severe pre-eclampsia and up to a fourfold increased risk of low birth weight deliveries. Some of these unfavourable outcomes are more marked in women who are diagnosed for the first time in pregnancy. A recent study has also shown that already high normal maternal FT4 levels are associated with a decrease in child IQ and gray matter and cortex volumes, similar to the effects of hypothyroidism.

Uncontrolled and inadequately treated maternal hyperthyroidism may also result in fetal and neonatal hyperthyroidism due to the transplacental transfer of stimulatory TSH receptor antibodies. Clinical neonatal hyperthyroidism occurs in about 1% of infants born to mothers with Graves' disease. Rarely, neonatal hypothyroidism may also be observed in the infants of mothers with Graves' hyperthyroidism. This may result from transplacental transfer of circulating maternal anti-thyroid drugs, pituitary-thyroid axis suppression from transfer of maternal thyroxine.

=== Management of hyperthyroidism in pregnancy ===
Ideally, a woman who is known to have hyperthyroidism should seek pre-pregnancy advice, although as yet there is no evidence for its benefit. Appropriate education should allay fears that are commonly present in these women. She should be referred for specialist care for frequent checking of her thyroid status, thyroid antibody evaluation and close monitoring of her medication needs. Medical therapy with anti-thyroid medications is the treatment of choice for hyperthyroidism in pregnancy. Methimazole and propylthiouracil are effective in preventing pregnancy complications by hyperthyroidism. Surgery is considered for patients who have severe adverse reactions to anti-thyroid drugs and this is best performed in the second trimester of pregnancy. Radioactive iodine is absolutely contraindicated in pregnancy and the puerperium. If a woman is already receiving carbimazole, a change to propylthiouracil is recommended, but this should be changed back to carbimazole after the first trimester. On occasion, Carbimazole is associated with skin and midline defects in the fetus, but propylthiouracil long-term can cause liver side effects in the adult. Carbimazole and propylthiouracil are both secreted in breast milk, but evidence suggests that antithyroid drugs are safe during lactation. There are no adverse effects on IQ or psychomotor development in children whose mothers have received antithyroid drugs in pregnancy. Current guidelines suggest that a pregnant patient should be on propylthiouracil during the first trimester of pregnancy due to lower teratogenic effects and then be switched to methimazole during the second and third trimesters due to lower liver dysfunction side effects.

== Postpartum thyroiditis ==
Postpartum thyroid dysfunction is a syndrome of thyroid dysfunction occurring within the first 12 months of delivery as a consequence of the postpartum immunological rebound that follows the immune-tolerant state of pregnancy. Postpartum thyroid dysfunction is destructive thyroiditis with similar pathogenetic features to Hashimoto's thyroiditis.

The disease is very common, with a prevalence of 5-9% of unselected postpartum women. Typically, there is a transient hyperthyroid phase that is followed by a phase of hypothyroidism. Permanent hypothyroidism occurs in as much as 30% of cases after 3 years and in 50% at 7–10 years. The hyperthyroid phase will not usually require treatment, but, rarely, propranolol may be used for symptom control in severe cases. The hypothyroid phase should be treated with thyroxine if patients are symptomatic, planning to get pregnant, or if TSH levels are above 10 mU/L. Long-term follow-up is necessary due to the risk of permanent hypothyroidism.

Nearly all the women with Postpartum thyroid dysfunction have anti-thyroid peroxidase antibodies. This marker can be a useful screening test in early pregnancy, as 50% of women with antibodies will develop thyroid dysfunction postpartum. In addition, some but not all studies have shown an association between Postpartum thyroid dysfunction and depression, so thyroid function should be checked postpartum in women with mood changes.
