= HELLP syndrome =

Complication of pregnancy associated with severe pre-eclampsia

- Specialty: Obstetrics
- Symptoms: Feeling tired, retaining fluid, headache, nausea, upper abdominal pain, blurry vision, seizures
- Complications: Disseminated intravascular coagulation (DIC), placental abruption, kidney failure, pulmonary edema
- Usual onset: Last 3 months of pregnancy or shortly after childbirth
- Types: Complete, incomplete
- Causes: Unknown
- Risk factors: Preeclampsia, eclampsia, previously having HELLP, mother older than 25 years
- Diagnostic method: Blood tests
- Differential diagnosis: Viral hepatitis, thrombotic thrombocytopenic purpura, cholangitis, hemolytic uremic syndrome
- Treatment: Delivery of the baby as soon as possible, management of blood pressure
- Prognosis: <1% risk of death (mother); 7.3% to 11.9% risk of death (child)
- Frequency: ~0.7% of pregnancies

HELLP syndrome is a complication of pregnancy; the acronym stands for hemolysis, elevated liver enzymes, and low platelet count. It usually begins during the last three months of pregnancy or shortly after childbirth. Symptoms may include feeling tired, retaining fluid, headache, nausea, upper right abdominal pain, blurry vision, nosebleeds, and seizures. Complications may include disseminated intravascular coagulation, placental abruption, and kidney failure.

The cause is unknown. The condition occurs in association with pre-eclampsia or eclampsia. Other risk factors include previously having the syndrome and a mother older than 25 years. The underlying mechanism may involve abnormal placental development. Diagnosis is generally based on blood tests finding signs of red blood cell breakdown (lactate dehydrogenase greater than 600 U/L), an aspartate transaminase greater than 70 U/L, and platelets less than 100×10^{9}/l. If not all the criteria are present, the condition is incomplete.

Treatment generally involves delivering the baby as soon as possible. This is particularly true if the pregnancy is beyond 34 weeks of gestation. Medications may be used to decrease blood pressure and blood transfusions may be required.

HELLP syndrome occurs in about 0.7% of pregnancies and affects about 15% of women with eclampsia or severe pre-eclampsia. Death of the mother is uncommon (< 1%). Outcomes in the babies are generally related to how premature they are at birth. The syndrome was first named in 1982 by American gynaecologist Louis Weinstein.

== Signs and symptoms ==
The first signs of HELLP usually start appearing midway through the third trimester, though the signs can appear in earlier and later stages. It is highly associated with known pre-eclampsia. Risk factors for pre-eclampsia include older age, uncontrolled hypertension, diabetes mellitus, and obesity. Signs and symptoms of HELLP vary in severity and between individuals and are commonly mistaken for normal pregnancy symptoms, especially if they are not severe.

HELLP syndrome patients experience general discomfort followed by severe epigastric pain or right upper abdominal quadrant pain, accompanied by nausea, vomiting, backache, anaemia, and hypertension. Some patients may also have a headache and visual issues. These symptoms may also become more severe at night. As the condition progresses and worsens, a spontaneous hematoma occurs following the rupture of the liver capsule, which occurs more frequently in the right lobe. The presence of any combination of these symptoms, subcapsular liver hematoma in particular, warrants an immediate check-up due to the high morbidity and mortality rates of this condition.

== Risk factors ==
Elevated body mass index and metabolic disorders, as well as antiphospholipid syndrome, significantly increase the risk of HELLP syndrome in all female patients. Females who have had or are related to a female with previous HELLP syndrome complications tend to be at a higher risk in all their subsequent pregnancies.

The risk of HELLP syndrome is not conclusively associated with a specific genetic variation, but likely a combination of genetic variations, such as FAS gene, VEGF gene, glucocorticoid receptor gene and the tol-like receptor gene, increase the risk.

== Pathophysiology ==
The pathophysiology remains unclear, and an exact cause is yet to be found. However, it shares a common mechanism, which is endothelial cell injury, with other conditions, such as acute kidney injury and thrombotic thrombocytopenic purpura. Increasing the understanding of HELLP syndrome's pathophysiology will enhance diagnostic accuracy, especially in the early stages. This will lead to advancements in the prevention, management, and treatment of the condition, which will increase the likelihood of maternal and fetal survival and recovery.

=== Inflammation and coagulation ===
As a result of endothelial cell injury, a cascade of pathological reactions manifests and becomes increasingly severe and even fatal as signs and symptoms progress. Following endothelial injury, vasospasms and platelet activation occur alongside the decreased release of the endothelium-derived relaxing factor and increased release of von Willebrand factor (vWF), leading to general activation of the coagulation cascade and inflammation. Placental components, such as inflammatory cytokines and syncytiotrophoblast particles interact with the maternal immune system and endothelial cells, further promoting coagulation and inflammation. These interactions also elevate leukocyte numbers and interleukin concentrations, as well as increase complement activity.

=== Low platelet count ===
vWF degradation in HELLP syndrome is inhibited due to decreased levels of degrading proteins, leading to an increased exposure of platelets to vWF. As a result, thrombotic microangiopathies develop and lead to thrombocytopenia.

=== Blood breakdown ===
As a result of the high number of angiopathies, the erythrocytes fragment as they pass through the blood vessels with damaged endothelium and large fibrin networks, leading to macroangiopathic haemolytic anaemia. As a consequence of hemolysis, lactic acid dehydrogenase (LDH) and hemoglobin are released, with the latter binding to serum bilirubin or haptoglobin.

=== Liver ===
During the coagulation cascade, fibrin is deposited in the liver and leads to hepatic sinusoidal obstruction and vascular congestion, which increases intrahepatic pressure. Placenta-derived FasL (CD95L), which is toxic to human hepatocytes, leads to hepatocyte apoptosis and necrosis by inducing the expression of TNFα and results in the release of liver enzymes. Hepatic damage is worsened by the disrupted portal and total hepatic blood flow that results as a consequence of the microangiopathies. Collectively, widespread endothelial dysfunction and hepatocellular damage result in global hepatic dysfunction, often leading to liver necrosis, haemorrhages, and capsular rupture.

== Diagnosis ==
Early and accurate diagnosis, which relies on laboratory tests and imaging exams, is essential for treatment and management and significantly reduces the morbidity rate. However, diagnosis of the syndrome is challenging, especially due to the variability in the signs and symptoms and the lack of consensus amongst healthcare professionals. Similarities to other conditions, as well as normal pregnancy features, commonly lead to misdiagnosed cases or, more often, delayed diagnosis.

There is a consensus regarding the three main diagnostic criteria of HELLP syndrome, which include hepatic dysfunction, thrombocytopenia, and microangiopathic haemolytic anaemia in patients suspected to have preeclampsia.

- A blood smear will often exhibit abnormalities, such as schistocytes, bur cells, and helmet cells, which indicate erythrocyte damage.
- Thrombocytopenia, which is the earliest coagulopathy present in all HELLP syndrome patients, is indicated by low platelet count (below 100 x 109 L-1) or by testing the levels of fibrin metabolites and antithrombin III.
- Elevated serum levels of certain proteins, in particular, LDH, alanine transaminase (ALT), and aspartate transaminase (AST), are indicative of hepatic dysfunction. Extremely high serum levels of these proteins, specifically LDH levels > 1,400 IU/L, AST levels > 150 IU/L and ALT levels > 100 IU/L, significantly elevate the risk of maternal mortality.

Several other, but less conclusive, clinical diagnostic criteria are also used in diagnosis alongside the main clinical diagnostic criteria for HELLP syndrome.

- De novo manifestation of hypertension with systolic pressure and diastolic pressure above 160mmHg and 110 mmHg, respectively.
- Proteinuria, leucocytosis and elevated uric acid concentrations > 7.8 mg.
- Decreased serum haptoglobin and haemoglobin levels.
- Increased serum bilirubin levels and visual disturbances.

Imaging tests, such as ultrasound, tomography, or magnetic resonance imaging (MRI), are instrumental in the correct diagnosis of HELLP syndrome in patients with suspected liver dysfunction. Unurgent cases must undergo MRI, but laboratory tests, such as glucose determination, are more encouraged in mild cases of HELLP syndrome.

=== Classification ===
A classification system developed in Mississippi measures the severity of the syndrome using the lowest observed platelet count in the patients alongside the appearance of the other two main clinical criteria. Class I is the most severe, with a relatively high risk of morbidity and mortality, compared to the other two classes.

- Class I HELLP syndrome is characterised by a platelet count below 50,000/μL.
- Class II HELLP syndrome is characterised by a platelet count of 50,000-100,000/μL.
- Class III HELLP syndrome is characterised by a platelet count of 100,000-150,000/μL.

Another classification system, introduced in Memphis, categorises HELLP syndrome based on its expression.

- Partial expression of the condition is characterised by the manifestation of one or two of the main diagnostic criteria.
- The complete expression of the condition is characterised by the manifestation of all three main diagnostic criteria.

== Treatment ==
The only current recommended and most effective treatment is delivery of the baby, as the signs and symptoms diminish and gradually disappear following the delivery of the placenta. Prompt delivery is the only viable option in cases with multiorgan dysfunction or multiorgan failure, haemorrhage, and considerable danger to the fetus. Certain medications are also used to target and alleviate specific symptoms.

Corticosteroids are of unclear benefit, though there is tentative evidence that they can increase the mother's platelet count.

== Prognosis ==
With treatment, maternal mortality is about 1 percent, although complications such as placental abruption, acute kidney injury, subcapsular liver hematoma, permanent liver damage, and retinal detachment occur in about 25% of women. Perinatal mortality (stillbirths plus death in infancy) is between 73 and 119 per 1000 babies of women with HELLP syndrome, while up to 40% are small for gestational age. In general, however, factors such as gestational age are more important than the severity of HELLP in determining the outcome in the baby.

== Epidemiology ==
HELLP syndrome affects 10-20% of pre-eclampsia patients and is a complication in 0.5-0.9% of all pregnancies. Caucasian women over 25 years of age comprise most of the diagnosed HELLP syndrome cases. In 70% of cases before childbirth, the condition manifests in the third trimester, but 10% and 20% of the cases exhibit symptoms before and after the third trimester, respectively. Postpartum occurrences are also observed in 30% of all HELLP syndrome cases.

== History ==
HELLP syndrome was identified as a distinct clinical entity (as opposed to severe pre-eclampsia) by Dr. Louis Weinstein in 1982. In a 2005 article, Weinstein wrote that the unexplained postpartum death of a woman who had haemolysis, abnormal liver function, thrombocytopenia, and hypoglycemia motivated him to review the medical literature and to compile information on similar women. He noted that cases with features of HELLP had been reported as early as 1954.

== See also ==
- Acute fatty liver of pregnancy
- Hypertrophic decidual vasculopathy
