= Small for gestational age =

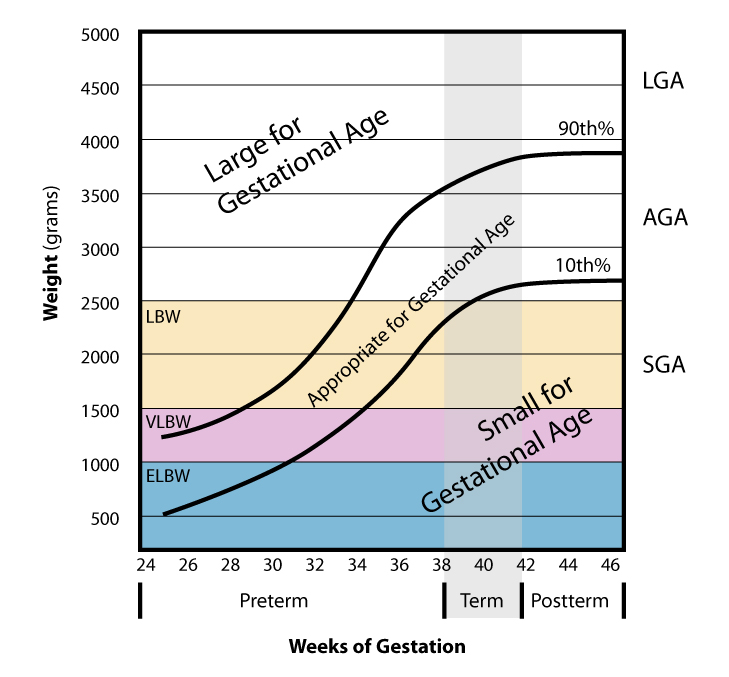
- Graph showing which babies fit the definition of small. (DiseaseDB #31952)
- Specialty: Pediatrics

Small for gestational age (SGA) newborns are those who are smaller in size than normal for the gestational age. SGA is most commonly defined as a weight below the 10th percentile for the gestational age. SGA predicts susceptibility to hypoglycemia, hypothermia, and polycythemia. By definition, at least 10% of all newborns will be labeled SGA. All SGA babies should be watched for signs of failure to thrive, hypoglycemia, and other health conditions.

== Causes ==
Being small for gestational age is broadly either:

- Being constitutionally small, or caused by a genetic trait of the baby
- Intrauterine growth restriction, also called pathological SGA

== Diagnosis ==
The condition is defined by birth weight and/or length.

Intrauterine growth restriction is generally diagnosed by measuring the mother's uterus, with the fundal height being less than it should be for that stage of the pregnancy. If it is suspected, the mother will usually be sent for an ultrasound to confirm.

There are numerous Single Nucleotide Polymorphisms (SNPs), or other genetic mutations, that increase the risk of having a small for gestational age baby.

== Management ==
Ninety percent of babies born SGA catch up in growth by the time they reach two years old. For the ten percent of those without catch-up growth by two years old, an endocrinologist should be consulted. Some cases warrant growth hormone therapy.

Hypoglycemia is common in asymmetrical SGA babies because their larger brains burn calories at a faster rate than their usually limited fat stores can hold. Hypoglycemia is treated by frequent feedings and/or additions of cornstarch-based products (such as Duocal powder) to the feedings.

Some common conditions and disorders are found in many babies who are SGA (and especially those without catch-up growth by two years old).

- Gastroenterologist – for gastrointestinal issues such as reflux and/or delayed gastric emptying
- Dietitian – to address caloric deficits. Dietitians are usually brought in for cases that include failure to thrive. According to the theory of thrifty phenotype, causes of growth restriction also trigger epigenetic responses in the fetus that are otherwise activated in times of chronic food shortage, and if the offspring develops in an environment rich in food, it may be more prone to metabolic disorders such as obesity and type II diabetes.
- Speech-language pathologist or occupational therapist – occupational therapists may also treat sensory issues
- Behaviorist – for feeding issues, a behavioral approach may also be used, but usually for older children (over 2)
- Allergist – to diagnose or rule out food allergies (not necessarily more common in those SGA than the normal population)
- Ear, nose, and throat doctor – to diagnose enlarged adenoids or tonsils (not necessarily more common in those SGA than the normal population)

For intrauterine growth restriction (during pregnancy), possible treatments include the early induction of labor, though this is only done if the condition has been diagnosed and seen as a risk to the health of the fetus.

== Terminology ==
If small for gestational age babies have been the subject of intrauterine growth restriction, formerly known as intrauterine growth retardation, the term "SGA associated with intrauterine growth restriction" is used. Intrauterine growth restriction refers to a condition in which a fetus is unable to achieve its genetically determined potential size. This functional definition seeks to identify a population of fetuses at risk for modifiable but otherwise poor outcomes. This definition intentionally excludes fetuses that are small for gestational age (SGA) but are not pathologically small. Infants born SGA with severe short stature (or severe SGA) are defined as having a length less than 2.5 standard deviation scores below the mean.

A related term is low birth weight, defined as an infant with a birth weight (that is, mass at the time of birth) of less than 2,500 g (5 lb 8 oz), regardless of gestational age at the time of birth. Other related terms include "very low birth weight", which is less than 1,500 g (3 lb 5 oz); and "extremely low birth weight", which is less than 1,000 g (2 lb 3 oz). Normal weight at term delivery is 2,500–4,200 g (5 lb 8 oz – 9 lb 4 oz).

SGA is not a synonym of low birth weight, very low birth weight, or extremely low birth weight. For example, with a 35-week gestational age delivery, a weight of 2,250 g (4 lb 15 oz) is appropriate for gestational age but is still low birth weight. One third of low-birth-weight neonates – infants weighing less than 2,500 g (5 lb 8 oz) – are small for gestational age.

There is an 8.1% incidence of low birth weight in developed countries and 6–30% in developing countries. Much of this can be attributed to the health of the mother during pregnancy. One-third of babies born with a low birth weight are also small for gestational age. Infants that are born at low birth weights are at risk of developing neonatal infection.

Both low and high maternal serum Vitamin D (25-OH) are associated with higher incidence SGA in white women, although the correlation does not seem to hold for African American women.

Mean weight for gestational age at birth with standard deviation and 10th percentile calculated by Z-score
Gestational age at birth (weeks)	Mean weight (grams)	SD	10th%
22	467	92	354
23	553	109	416
24	626	129	473
25	714	156	529
26	819	186	597
27	935	215	677
28	1073	242	770
29	1211	269	882
30	1396	309	1018
31	1588	336	1166
32	1800	371	1335
33	2033	405	1538
34	2296	428	1772
35	2560	440	2021
36	2799	441	2261
37	3028	456	2477
38	3209	432	2665
39	3333	419	2810
40	3417	416	2904
41	3486	422	2958
42	3512	429	2985
43	3550	444	2981
44	3505	503	2952
