= Saadoon =

Saadoon is a surname. Notable people with the surname include:

- Mustafa Saadoon (footballer, born 1994), Iraqi footballer
- Mustafa Saadoon (footballer, born 2001), Iraqi footballer

== See also ==
- Saadoun, given name
- Sadun, given name and surname
