= Saadoun =

Saadoun or Sadoun is a given name. Notable people with the given name include:

- Saadoun Jaber (born 1950), Iraqi singer, oud songwriter, and oud player
- Saadoun Antar al-Janabi (died 2005), Iraqi defence attorney
- Saadoun al-Qaisi, Iraqi government/security official
- Saadoun Shakir, Iraqi politician and intelligence official
- Saadoun al-Tikriti (died 1958), Iraqi politician
- Sadoun al-Zubaydi, Iraqi professor of English literature

== See also ==
- Sadun, a given name and surname
- Saadoon, surname
