= Muhammad Saleh Al-Jaberi =

Tunisian researcher and scholar

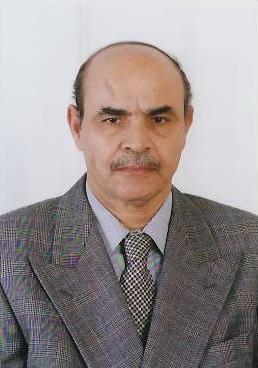
- Born: 14 February 1940 Tozeur, Tunisia
- Died: 19 June 2009 (aged 69) Ariana, Tunisia
- Occupation: Author, scholar
- Notable works: Laylatul Sanawatil ʿAshr (The Decade's Night) Yawmun Min Ayyam Zumra (A Day of The Troops')

Muhammad Saleh Al-Jaberi was a Tunisian researcher and scholar. He was born in the Tunisian city of Tozeur in February 1940, and he died in June 2009 in the Tunisian city of Ariana. Al-Jaberi specialized in recording the historical and literary movement in the Maghreb, specifically in Algeria, Libya, and Tunisia. This could be seen in his studies and researches on Tunisian literature and culture. As a poet, Al-Jaberi also excelled in his narratives in short stories and novels, and he leaned towards realistic narratives that combine direct recordings and history in a clear, straightforward manner.

== His Education ==
During his early life, Al-Jaberi studied in Tozeur, and he entered a Kuttab at an early age. Then, he attended elementary school in Ibn-Shubbaṭ elementary school until 1953 before finishing his secondary school studies in the Secondary Institution in Tozeur. After that, he moved to the capital, Tunis, where he attended Zaytuna University where he got a certificate in 1961. He also studied in Baghdad where he obtained a licence, and he obtained a Master's of Advanced Study in Algeria in 1980 before obtaining a Doctorate degree specializing in Bayram al-Tunisi from the University of Algeria.

== His role in The Arab League Educational, Cultural and Scientific Organization (ALECSO) ==
Al-Jaberi was a teacher in Al-Wardiya District in Tunis, as well as a high school teacher in the Tunisian city of Monastir. Then, he became the director of literature in the Ministry of Culture before becoming the director of the Tunisian Cultural Center in Tripoli. In 1979, he became a member of the ALECSO where he supervised the cultural department until his retirement in 2000. Since then, he was appointed as the head for an encyclopedic project about notable Arab and Muslim figures and scholars. Nineteen volumes of this project have been published so far.

Some of the positions he held include: General writer for Rabiṭatul Qalamil Jadid (The New Pen Association – which is a literary foundation founded in Tunisia in the 1950s, and which was suppressed by colonial powers, a member in the Story and Novel Foundation of The Tunisian Writers' Union, the Arab Writers Union, and the director of the cultural center in Tripoli.

His novel Laylatul Sanawatil ʿAshr (The Decade's Night) was published in 1982 and it was chosen among the 100 best Arabic novels.

== His works ==
=== Novels ===
- Yawmun Min Ayyam Zumra (A Day in Zumra), and it is a novel with six editions, starting with the first edition in 1968, then in 1983, 1988, 1999, 2001, and 2004. It was adapted into a film titled (Radif 54) directed by Ali Obaid.
- Al-Baḥru Yanshuru Alwaḥuhu (The Sea Spreads Its Paintings) (1971).
- Laylatul Sanawatil ʿAshr (The Decade's Night), and it was adapted into a film in 1982 directed by Ibrahim Papay.

=== Short Story ===
- Innahu Al-Kharif Ya Ḥabibati (It Is Fall, My Love) (1971).
- Al-Rukh Yajul Fil Rukʿa (The Rukh Flies in The Patch) (1980).

=== Plays ===
- Kayfa La Aḥebul Nahār (Why Would I Not Love The Daytime) (1979).

=== Studies ===
- Al-Shiʿru Al-Tunisiyu Al-Muʿasir Khilala Qarnin (A Century of Contemporary Tunisian Poetry) (1975).
- Al-Shiʿru Al-Tunisiyu Al-Ḥadith (Modern Tunisian Poetry) (1975).
- Al-Qiṣa Al-Tunisiya Nash'atuha Wa Ruwaduha (The Tunisian Short Story, Its Foundation and Pioneers) (1977).
- Al-'Adabul Jazi'iriyu Al-Muʿasir (Contemporary Algerian Literature), Dar Al-Jil Publishing, Beirut, 2005.
- Abʿadul Masafāt (Furthest Distances) (1978).
- Al-'Adabul Jazi'iriyu Fi Tunis (Algerian Literature in Tunisia), Carthage, 1991.
- Dirasatun Fil Adabul Tunisiye (Studies in Tunisian Literature), in cooperation with notable Tunisian writers, 1979.
- Yawmiyat Al-Jihad Al-Libi Fil Saḥafal Tunisiya (Daily Libyan Resistance in Tunisian Press) (Volumes 1 & 2) (1983).
- Al-Kitabatul Qiṣaṣiyatu Fi Tunis (Short Story Writing in Tunisia, A Collaborative Study) (1992).
- Al-Nashaṭul ʿIlmi Wal Fikri Lil Muhajirin Al Jaza'iriyin Bi Tunis (Scientific and Scholarly Contributions by Algerians in Tunisia) (1983).
- Waḍʿul Qaṣida Fil Shiʿr Al-Tunisi Al-Muʿasir (The Poem in Contemporary Tunisian Verse).
- Bayram Al-Tunisi Fil Manfa (Bayram Al-Tunisi in Exile: Life and Works), Dar Al-Gharb Al-Islami Publishing.
- Al-Waʿi Al-Qawmi Wal Dini ʿInd Al-Shuʿara' and Jaza'iryin Al-Muhajireen 'Ila Tunis (Nationalistic and Religious Awareness of Algerian Writers in Tunisia).
- Min Thaqbul 'Ibr: Ru'a Fil Thaqafit Wal Ḥayat (From The Eye of The Needle: Visions of Culture and Life).
- Riḥlatun Jaza'riya (Algerian Trips), Dar Al-Gharb Al-Islami Publishing, Beirut, 2001.

== Al-Jaberi and radio ==
Al-Jaberi produced a number of radio broadcasts, including: Qasasat, and it was a weekly religious show. He also produced a TV series which was aired on Tunisian television titled (Babul Khawkha).

== In his memory ==
In his memory, his name was attributed to a system next to the cultural center in the Tunisian capital, Tunis.
