= Youssef Seddik =

Youssef Seddik may refer to:

- Youssef Seddik (philosopher) (born 1943), Tunisian Greek and Islamic philosopher
- Youssef Seddik (revolutionary) (1910–1975), Egyptian military figure and politician
