= Sadun =

Sadun is a masculine given name and surname of Arabic origin. Notable people with the name include:

== Given name ==
- Sadun Aren (1922–2008), Turkish academic and politician
- Sadun Artsruni (died 1282), Armenian prince
- Sadun Boro (1928–2015), first Turkish sailor to circumnavigate the globe
- Sa'dun Hammadi (1930–2007), Prime Minister of Iraq in 1991
- Sa'dun al-Ruayni, Wali of Barcelona

== Surname ==
- Abd Al-Baqi Abd Karim Al-Sadun (1947–2021), Iraqi politician
- Abdul Muhsin al-Sa'dun (1879–1929), Iraqi politician
- Alfredo Sadun (born 1950), American academic
- Elvio Sadun (1918–1974), Italian-American parasitologist
