= Tozeur =

Tozeur توزر (Arabic) ⵜⵓⵣⴻⵔ (Berber languages) Tūzir
- City
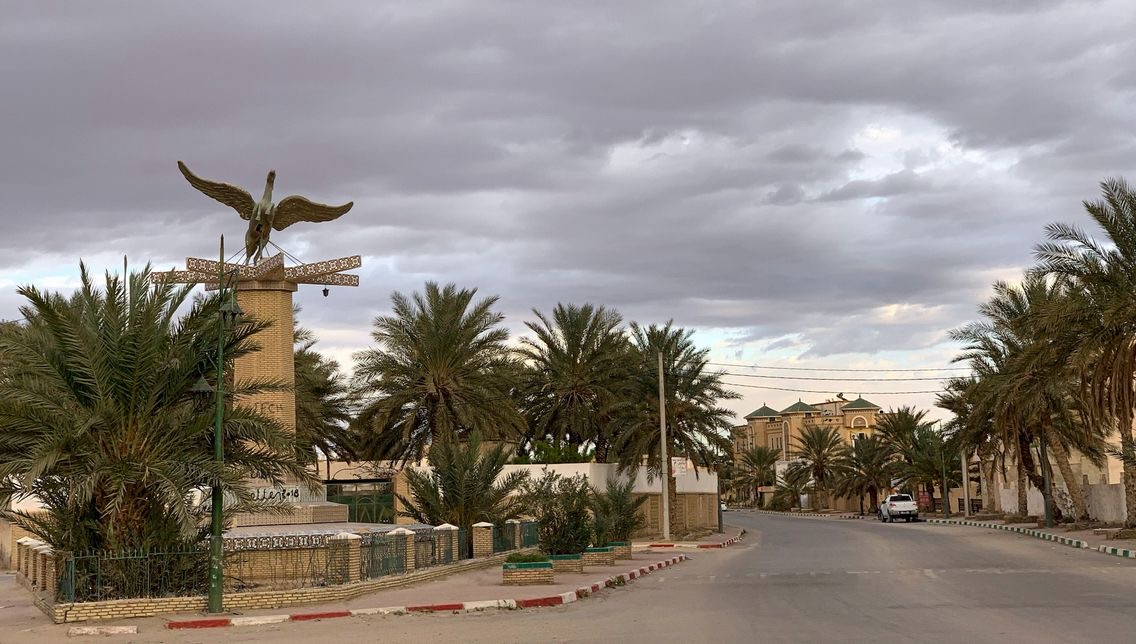
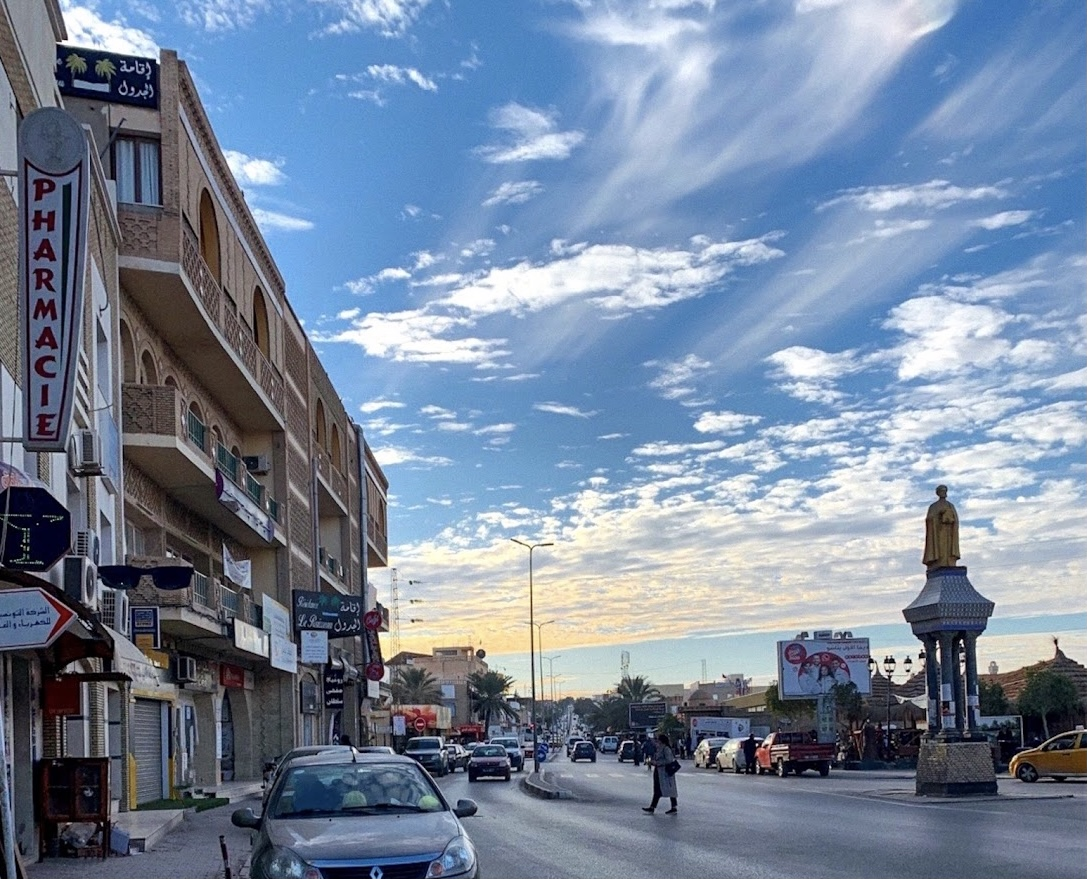
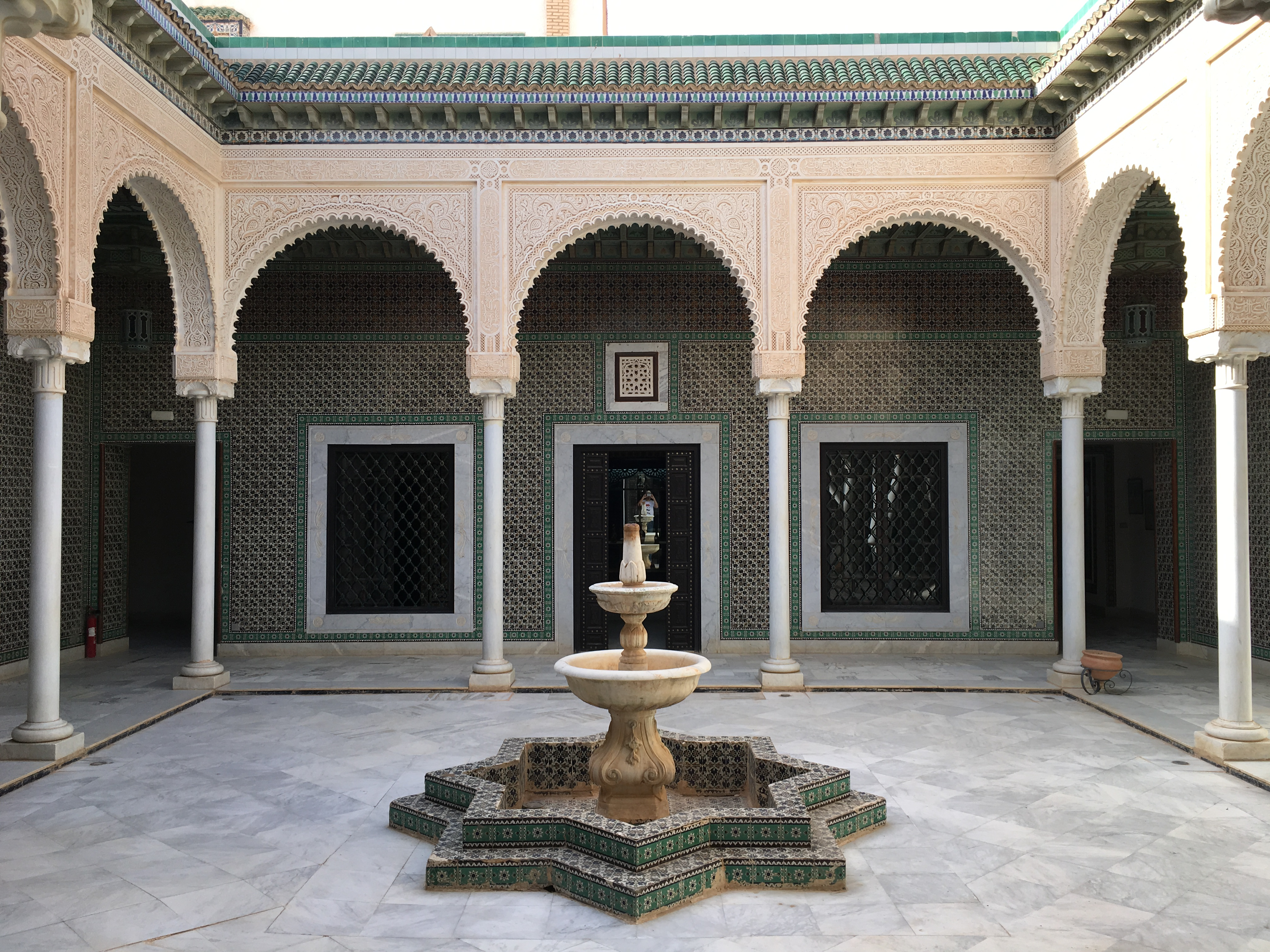
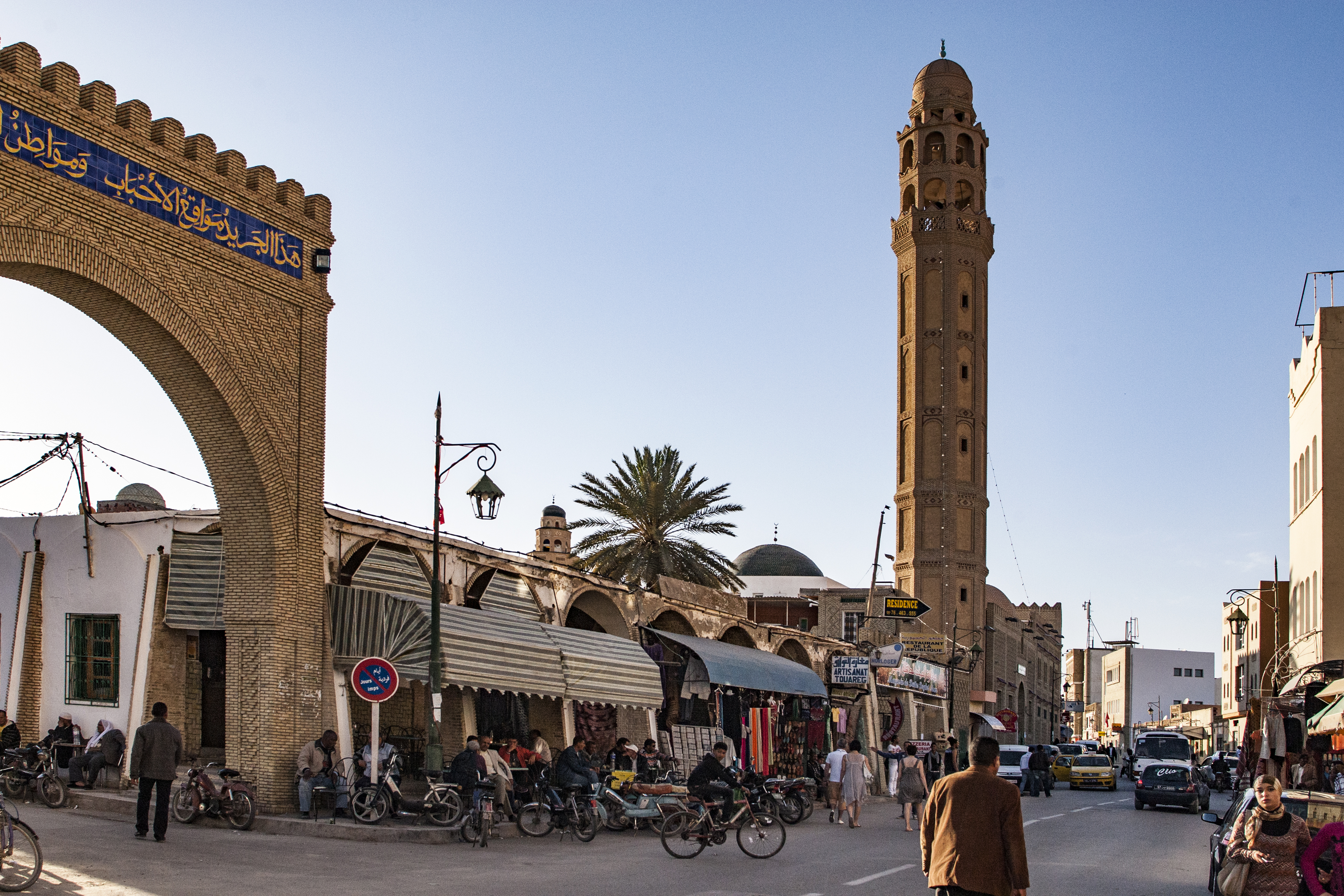
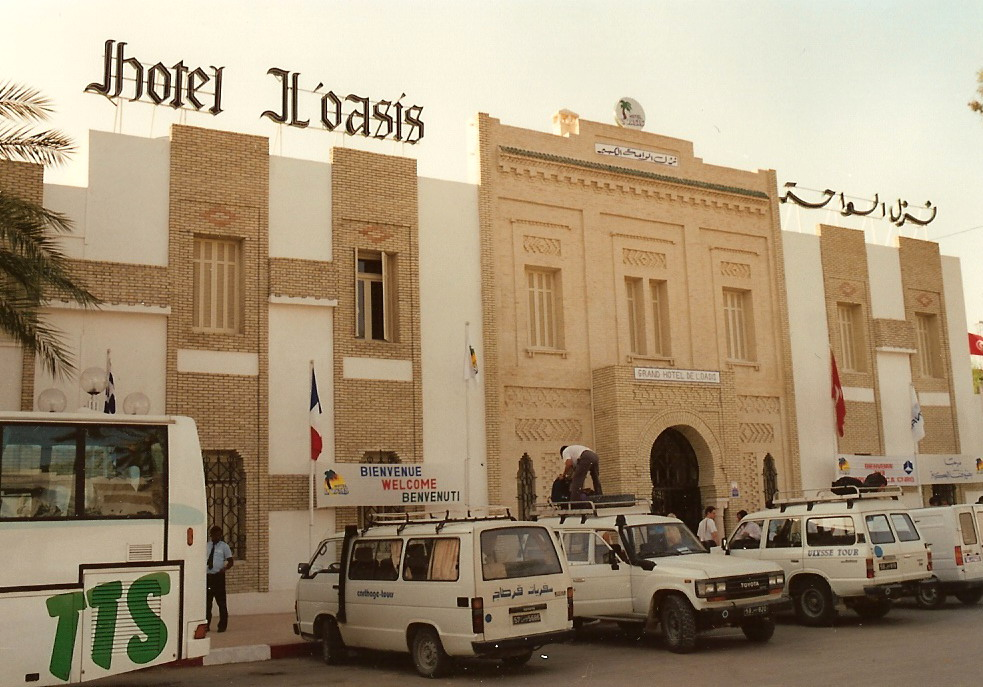
- Statue of Winged Horse Avenue Farhat Hached Dar Cherait Museum Avenue Habib Bourguiba Hotel Yadis Oasis
- Nickname: Pearl of the Desert
- Location in Tunisia
- Coordinates: 33°55′N 8°8′E
- Country: Tunisia
- Governorate: Tozeur Governorate
- Delegation(s): Tozeur North, Tozeur South

Government
  - Mayor: Chahine Zribi

Population (2022)
  - Total: 41,370
- Demonym(s): Arabic: توزري(ة) Tūzri(ya); French: Tozeurois(e)
- Time zone: UTC+1 (CET)
- Postal code: 2200

Tozeur (Arabic: توزر, romanized: Tūzir; Berber languages: ⵜⵓⵣⴻⵔ, romanized: Tuzər) is a city in southwest Tunisia. The city is located northwest of Chott el Djerid, in between this Chott and the smaller Chott el Gharsa. It is the capital of Tozeur Governorate. It was the site of the ancient city and former bishopric Tusuros, which remains a Latin Catholic titular see.

== Etymology ==
During the Roman era, Tozeur was known as Tusuros or Thusuros, and it was part of the Roman province of Byzacena in Africa Proconsularis.

Several hypotheses exist regarding the origin of the name Tozeur. One hypothesis links the name to the Egyptian pharaoh Tausret, whose name means “the powerful one” in ancient Egyptian. Following her reign as the last monarch of Egypt’s Nineteenth Dynasty, Tozeur is said to have been paid as tribute by the Kingdom of Kush in her honor. This theory is supported by architectural similarities between Tozeur and ancient Egyptian cities, particularly the use of sun-dried and kiln-fired mud brick.

The Tunisian philosopher Youssef Seddik has also suggested an ancient Egyptian origin, proposing that the prefix “T” is commonly found in toponyms such as Thebes, Tamazret, while “Ozeur” may be a latinized form of Osiris, the ancient Egyptian deity.

== History ==
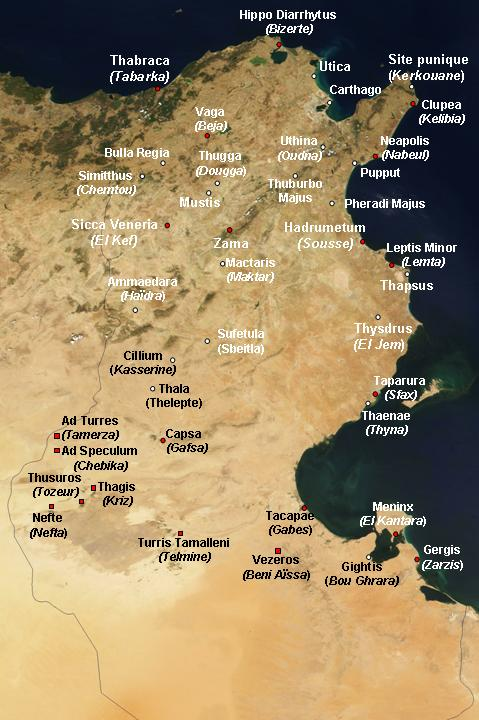
Map showing Roman Tusuros

During the Roman Empire and the Byzantine Empire and in the Vandal Kingdom, Tozeur was the site of Tusuros, in the Roman province of Byzacena (originally part of Africa Proconsularis).

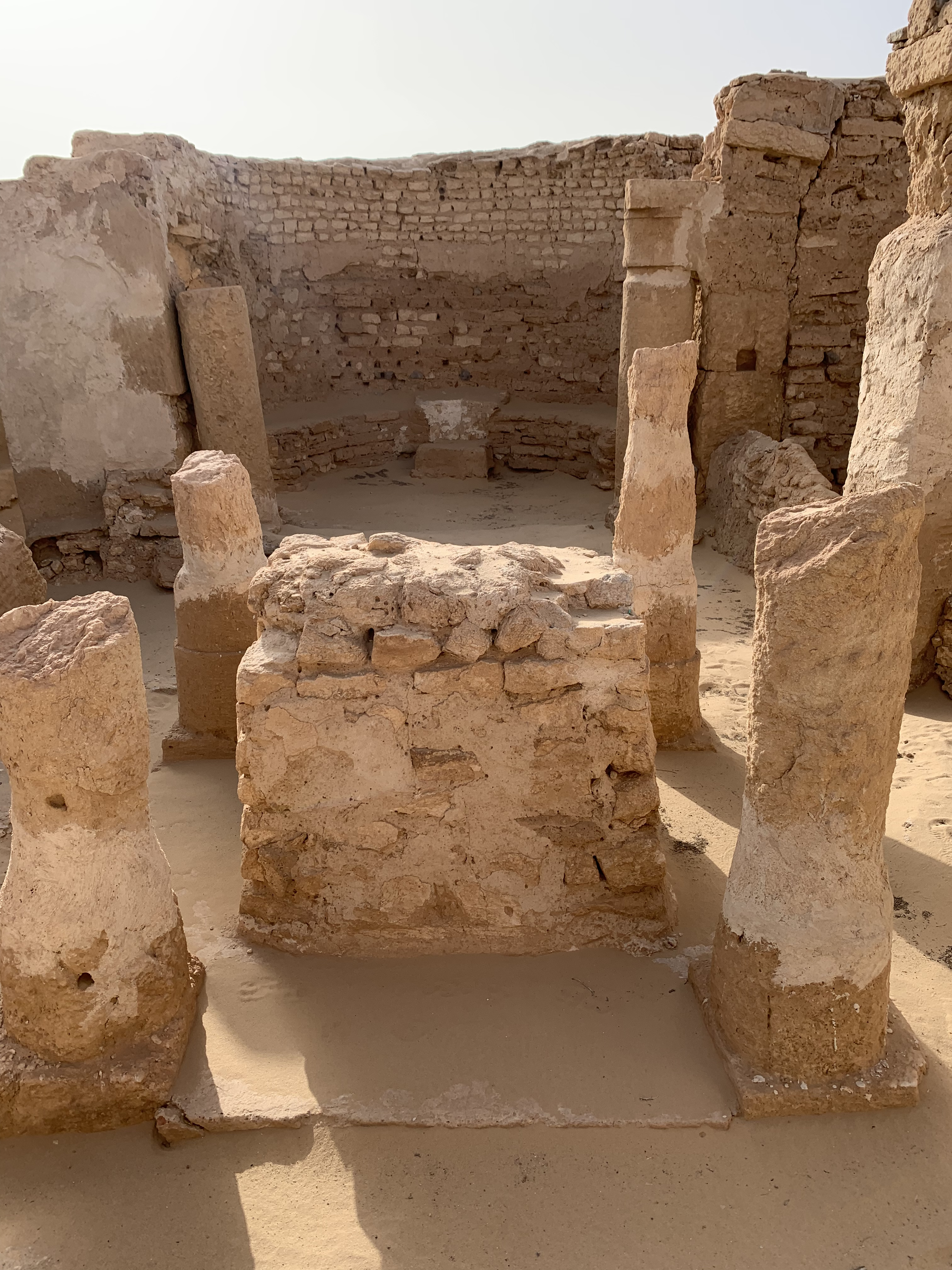
The archaeological site Koustilya, near Tozeur

=== Bishopric ===
At this time it was the seat of a suffragan bishopric, called Tusuros.

Located in the Sahel hinterland of the Byzacena coastline, close to the towns of Aquae and Nefta and south of Capsa and Ad Turres, Roman Tursuros became an important center of Donatism.

The bishopric ceased to function following the seventh-century arrival of Islam. The remains of an ancient church are visible in the foundations of an old mosque.

Four bishops (two canonical, two schismatic Donatist heretics) are historically documented

- Bennatus, partook in the Council of Cabarsussi, held in 393 by Maximianists, a sect of dissident Donatists, and signed their acts.
- Asellicus, 4th-century bishop, known from correspondence with Augustine of Hippo and Donatian of Reims and from tracts against one Aptus who was accused of Judaising. He attended the Council of Carthage (411) where the prevailing Catholics condemned Donatism as heresy.
- Florentinus participated in the Council of Carthage called in 484 by the Arian king Huneric of the Vandal Kingdom, whereafter he was exiled like most Catholic bishops, unlike Aptus, Asellicus' Donatist rival.

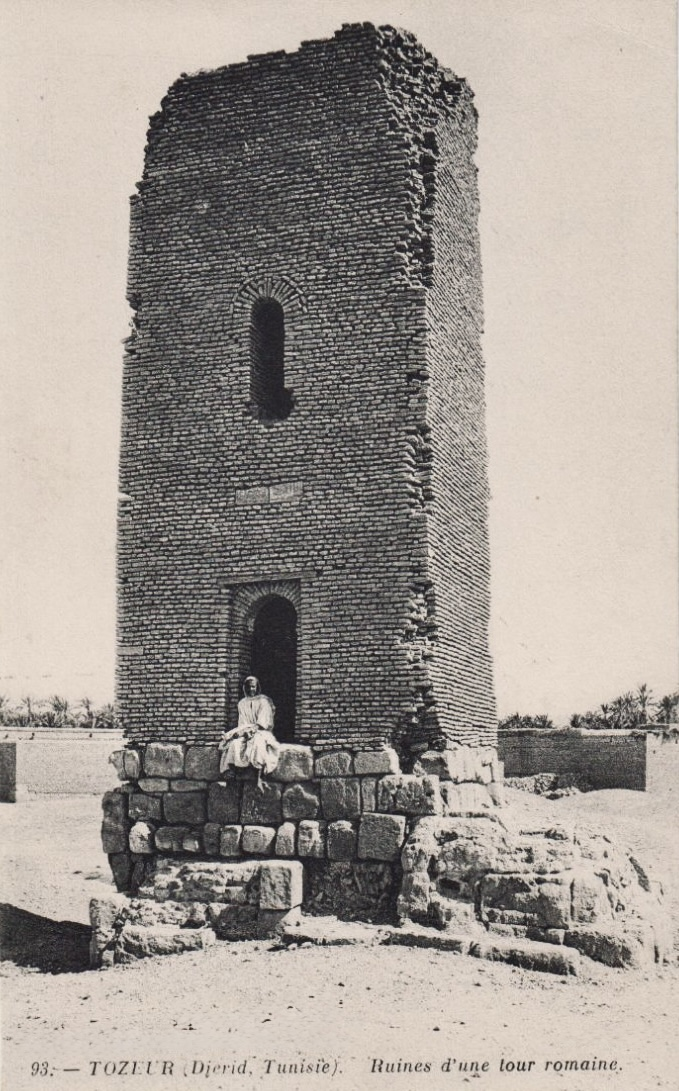
The site of the remains of the ancient church, in the early 1900’s

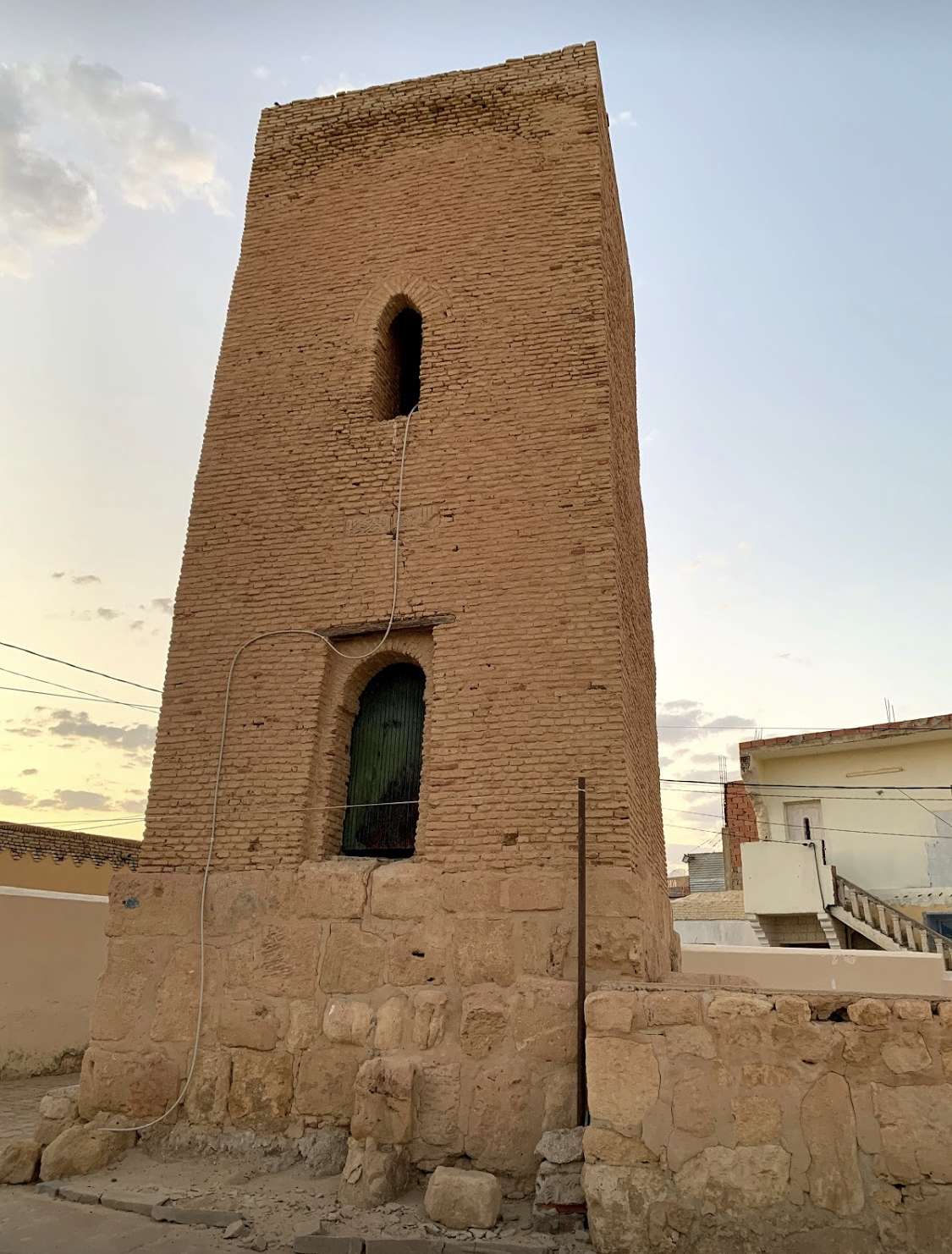
The site as seen today, preserving the remains of the ancient church

=== Arab rule ===
After the Umayyad conquest of North Africa in the late 6th century and early 7th century, the city became part of the Umayyad Caliphate, and later the Abbasid Caliphate.

Al-Tijani described Tozeur in the 14th century:

"Tozeur is the capital of the Djerid region, and there is no forest in the Jarid lands larger than it or with more abundant water. Its water originates from springs that emerge from the sand, gathering outside the town in a wide valley, from which numerous streams branch off. Each stream further divides into channels that the inhabitants distribute among themselves according to established ownership divisions, with known shares of water. They have appointed trustworthy officials from among their righteous men to oversee the distribution, allocating the water by the hours of day and night according to a well-known and established system. [..] Many of its people reside in its palm grove, and there is a stark contrast between the buildings within the grove and those inside the town. The structures in the grove are larger and more refined. Inside the town, there are two mosques for Friday prayers and a single bathhouse. Their main gathering place for leisure is at a location they call Bab al-Manshar, which is among the most beautiful spots for recreation because it is where the waters converge."

== Titular see ==
It was nominally restored in 1933 as Latin titular bishopric of Tusuros (Latin) / Tusuro (Curiate Italian) / Tusuritan(us) (Latin adjective) of the Roman Catholic Church.

It has had the following incumbents, so far of the fitting Episcopal (lowest) rank:

1. Joseph Leo Cardijn (born in Belgium) (15 February 1925 – 22 February 1965), Founder of the international Young Christian Workers (CAJ) then without prelature; later created Cardinal-Deacon of San Michele Arcangelo (25 February 1965 – 25 July 1967, his death);
2. Giovanni Benelli (11 June 1966 – 3 June 1977) as papal diplomat: Apostolic Pro-Nuncio to Senegal (11 June 1966 – 29 June 1967), Apostolic Delegate to Western Africa (11 June 1966 – 29 June 1967) and Roman Curia official: Substitute for General Affairs of Secretariat of State (29 June 1967 – 3 June 1977); later Metropolitan Archbishop of Florence (Italy) (3 June 1977 – 26 October 1982), created Cardinal-Priest of Santa Prisca (27 June 1977 – 26 October 1982, his death);
3. Thomas Cajetan Kelly (12 June 1977 – 28 December 1981) as Auxiliary bishop of Archdiocese of Washington (D.C.. United States) (12 June 1977 – 28 December 1981); later Metropolitan Archbishop of Louisville (United States) (28 December 1981 – 12 June 2007, his retirement), died in 2011;
4. Paul Lanneau (14 February 1982 – 26 January 2017, his death), first as Auxiliary Bishop of Archdiocese of Mechelen–Brussels (Belgium) (14 February 1982 – 20 March 2002), then as emeritus;
5. Bishop-elect Amilton Manoel da Silva, Passionists (C.P.) (7 June 2017 – present) as Auxiliary Bishop of Archdiocese of Curitiba (Brazil).

== Climate ==
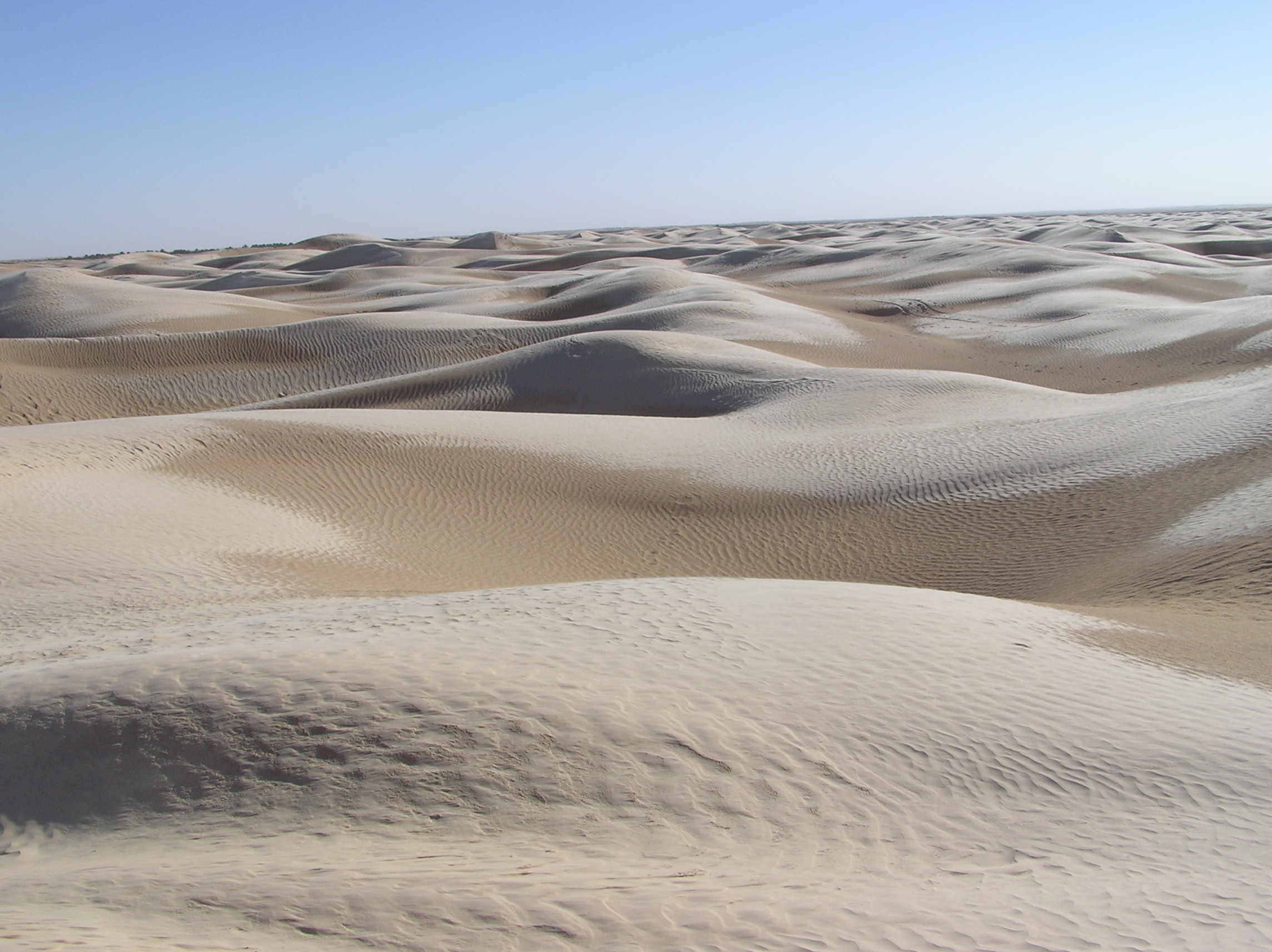
Sahara close to Tozeur (Tunisia).

Tozeur has a hot desert climate (Köppen climate classification BWh) typical of the northern edge of the Sahara. The annual average rainfall is 80.8 mm (3.18 inches), and the annual mean temperature (day and night) is 22.2 °C (72.0 °F), making the city both hot and dry year-round. The weather is usually settled and sunny throughout the year. Summers are extremely hot, with daily highs often exceeding 45 °C (113 °F) in the shade, and the sirocco may push temperatures close to 50 °C (122 °F). During winters, it can sometimes freeze at night and just before the sunrise, as the temperature may drop below 0 °C (32 °F).

Climate data for Tozeur (1991–2020, extremes 1950–present)
Month	Jan	Feb	Mar	Apr	May	Jun	Jul	Aug	Sep	Oct	Nov	Dec	Year
Record high °C (°F)	27.6 (81.7)	31.7 (89.1)	39.8 (103.6)	40.2 (104.4)	46.6 (115.9)	48.7 (119.7)	49.0 (120.2)	48.0 (118.4)	45.2 (113.4)	40.9 (105.6)	33.6 (92.5)	27.8 (82.0)	49.0 (120.2)
Mean daily maximum °C (°F)	17.0 (62.6)	19.2 (66.6)	23.0 (73.4)	27.4 (81.3)	32.3 (90.1)	37.1 (98.8)	40.0 (104.0)	39.6 (103.3)	34.9 (94.8)	29.6 (85.3)	22.6 (72.7)	17.9 (64.2)	28.4 (83.1)
Daily mean °C (°F)	11.9 (53.4)	13.6 (56.5)	17.4 (63.3)	21.3 (70.3)	25.9 (78.6)	30.4 (86.7)	33.3 (91.9)	33.2 (91.8)	29.2 (84.6)	24.2 (75.6)	17.5 (63.5)	12.9 (55.2)	22.6 (72.7)
Mean daily minimum °C (°F)	6.8 (44.2)	8.1 (46.6)	11.6 (52.9)	15.2 (59.4)	19.5 (67.1)	23.6 (74.5)	26.4 (79.5)	26.7 (80.1)	23.5 (74.3)	18.7 (65.7)	12.3 (54.1)	7.9 (46.2)	16.7 (62.1)
Record low °C (°F)	−2.6 (27.3)	−1.6 (29.1)	0.8 (33.4)	4.4 (39.9)	2.0 (35.6)	14.4 (57.9)	17.6 (63.7)	17.8 (64.0)	12.8 (55.0)	5.8 (42.4)	1.4 (34.5)	0.0 (32.0)	−2.6 (27.3)
Average precipitation mm (inches)	13.7 (0.54)	7.2 (0.28)	11.2 (0.44)	13.2 (0.52)	4.1 (0.16)	4.0 (0.16)	1.1 (0.04)	2.4 (0.09)	9.5 (0.37)	9.8 (0.39)	11.4 (0.45)	8.9 (0.35)	96.5 (3.80)
Average precipitation days (≥ 1.0 mm)	1.4	1.1	1.6	1.5	0.8	0.4	0.2	0.5	1.3	1.4	1.3	1.4	13.0
Average relative humidity (%)	63	55	52	49	46	42	40	44	51	56	60	64	52
Mean monthly sunshine hours	208.1	222.7	245.8	258.9	281.0	315.7	347.2	326.7	252.6	237.4	213.8	202.7	3,112.6
Source 1: Institut National de la Météorologie (humidity 1961-1990, sun 1981–2010) (Note: The Station ID for Tozeur is 66060111.)
Source 2: NOAA

== Modern city ==
With hundreds of thousands of palm trees, Tozeur is a large oasis. Dates are exported from Tozeur. In ancient times, before the advent of motorized vehicles, the oasis was important for the transportation through the Sahara, which took place in caravans. The name of the city in antiquity was Tusuros, it was an important Roman outpost. The Medina quarter of Tozeur, contains traditional architecture, fashion and workmanship.

=== Architecture ===
Tozeur, in common with the surrounding Jerid region, is noted for its yellow/brownish brickwork as well as its patterns in geometric designs which form the facades of most buildings in the old city and the new tourist zone.

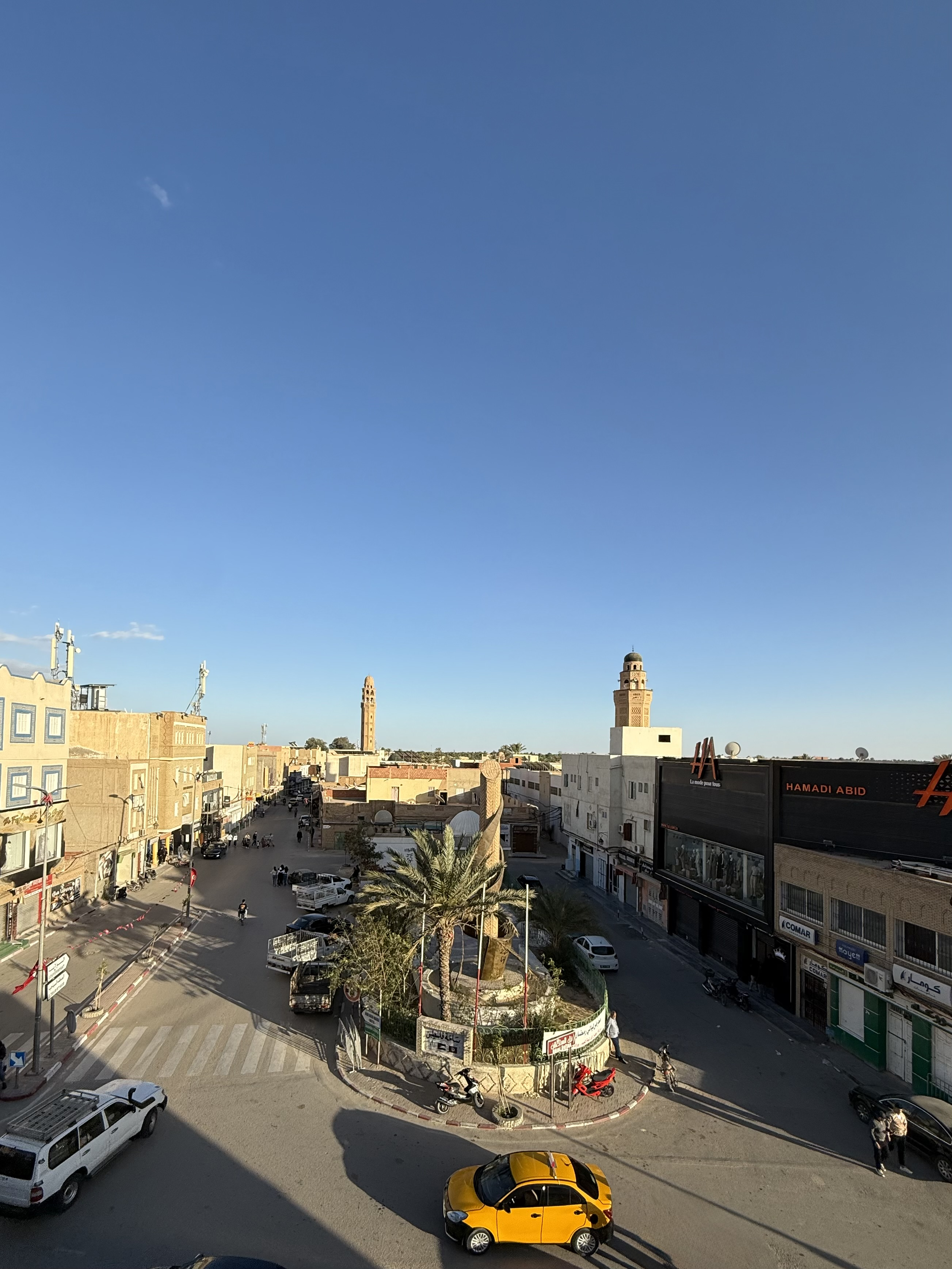
Place de Palestine (Palestine Square), Avenue Habib Bourguiba

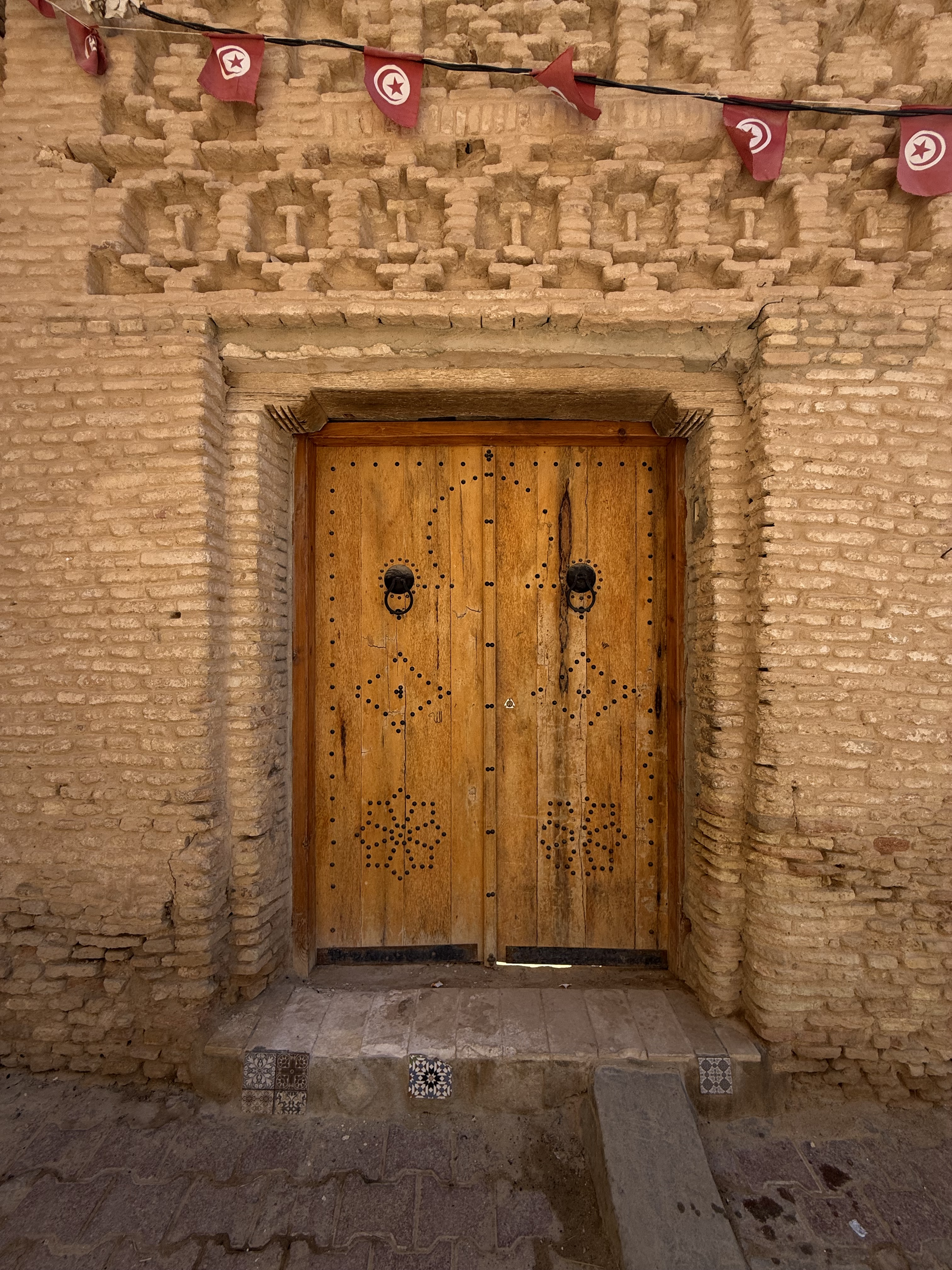
Typical door in Tozeur

A local in traditional Berber clothing in the old Medina of Tozeur, 2007

The Medina quarter of Ouled El Hadef (also known as Medina of Tozeur) is an example of the local brickwork which is one of the oldest neighborhoods in Tozeur. It was inhabited by both Muslim and Jewish communities, namely the Saadoun family. While the Jewish community no longer resides there, the Medina of Tozeur stands as a testament to a long history of coexistence.

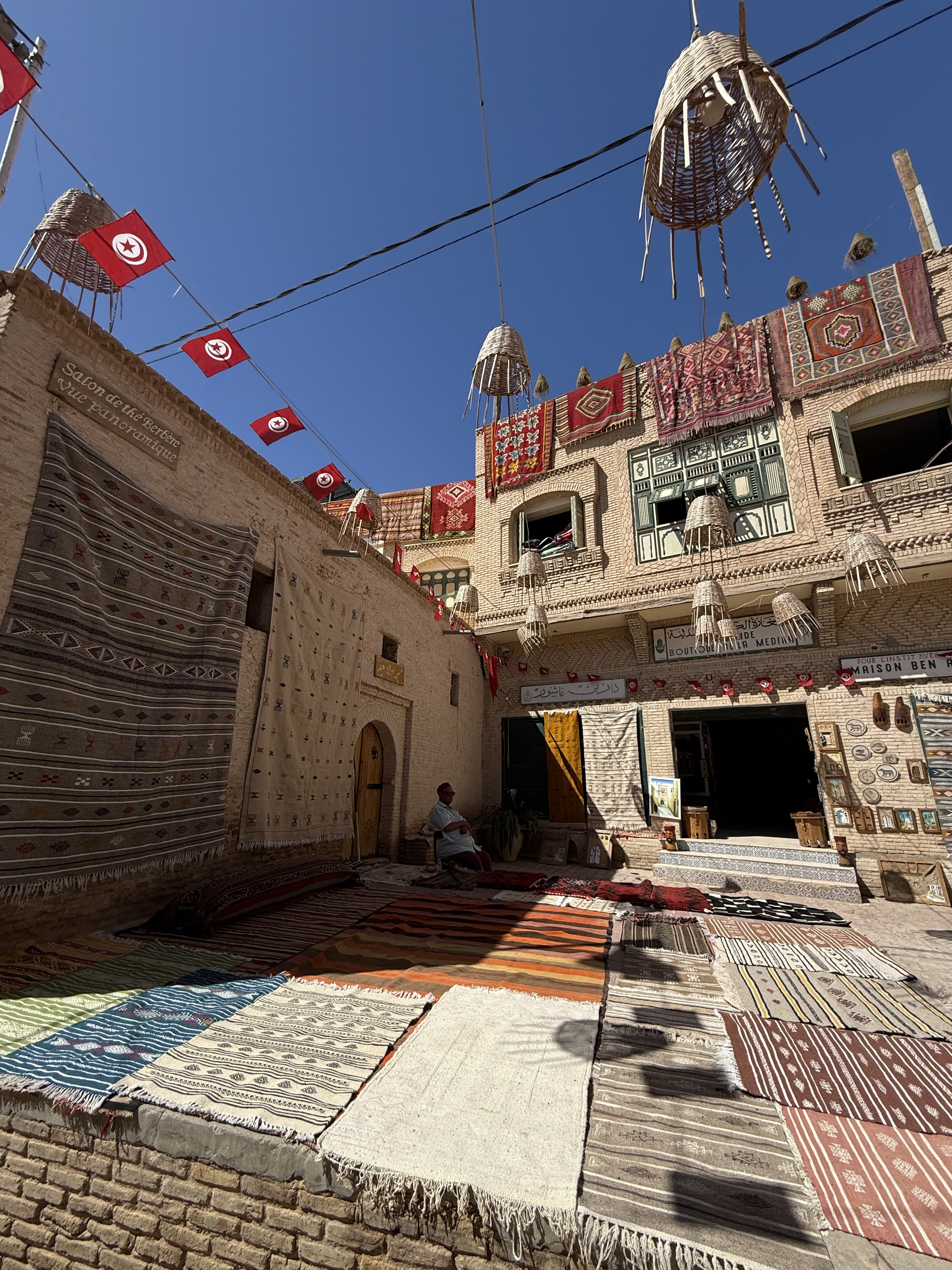
Medina quarter of Tozeur (Ouled El Hadef)

== Sport ==
Tozeur has a football club who plays in the First Professional Federation of Football in Tunisia, the team is called LPST (La Palme sportive de Tozeur). In 2010–2011 season the club almost made it to the First Professional Federation of Football.

== Economy ==
=== Overview ===
Although still the largest part of the local economy, dates and farming are becoming less appealing to the young, who are more often employed in tourism. Tourism is heavily developed and promoted, and Tozeur is considered a center of "Desert tourism". The annual "International Festival of Oases" (Arabic: المهرجان الدولي للواحات بتوزر) takes place in the town in November and December each year.

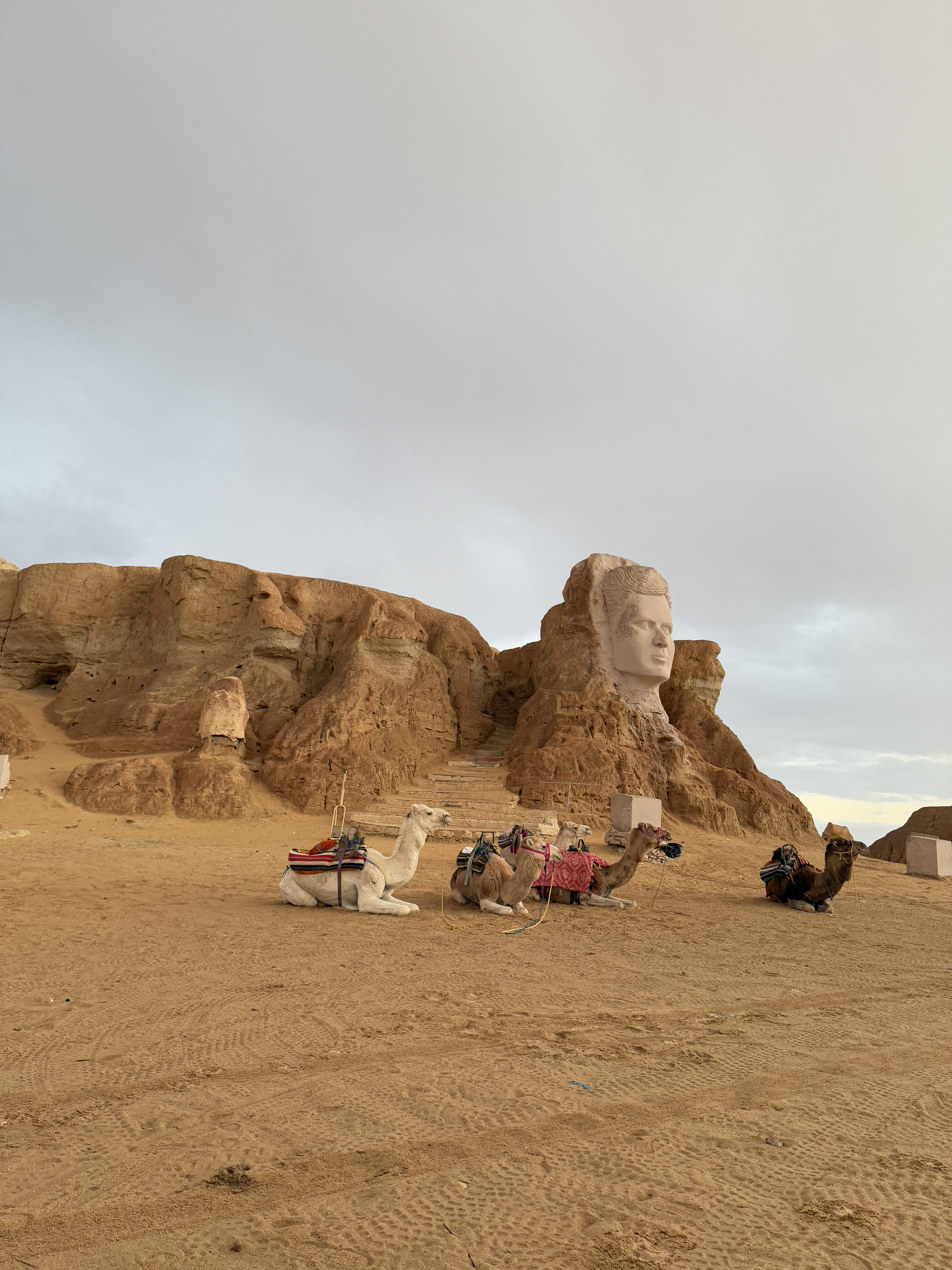
Public park of Ras El Aïn

The government initiated two large-scale projects:

1. Tapping of deep aquifers by wells. This led to the depletion of most natural springs and abandonment of the traditional irrigation canals. Tozeur's oasis has been irrigated based on an open surface canal system designed in the 13th century by engineer Ibn Chabbat. This traditional irrigation system is currently being replaced by a system of concrete pipes. Water that was traditionally free to farmers is now being sold to offset the cost of these projects and pipes.
2. The second part of these local projects is the initiation of new oases around town. These oases' productivity is very low and their future highly unstable. This situation is slowly leading to the decay of the old oases (due to salinity, poor planning and lack of skilled workers) with productivity plummeting and the health and future of the oases questionable.

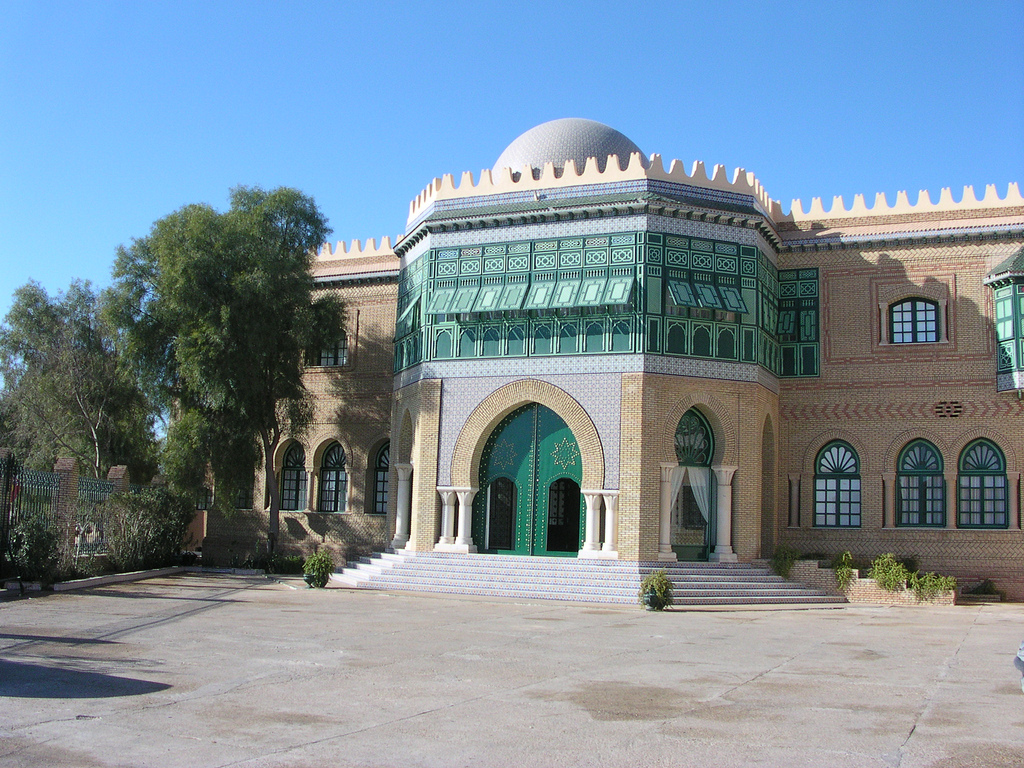
Dar Cherait Museum

The region around Tozeur is seeing a large influx of unemployed workers and their families from the once rich phosphate region of Metlaoui, Gafsa and Om Laarayes in hope of work in the tourism sector. The phosphate mines are no longer productive and thousands of workers were laid off after the government sold them to European investors.

Overall the region, and Tozeur in particular, is going through a tough time. The region is embracing the unstable tourism economy and shying away from its traditional agricultural based economy. During the first Gulf War the sector suffered with a loss of large number of workers and an increase in unemployment. The same happened during 11 September 2001 attacks and the Iraq War.

=== Transport ===
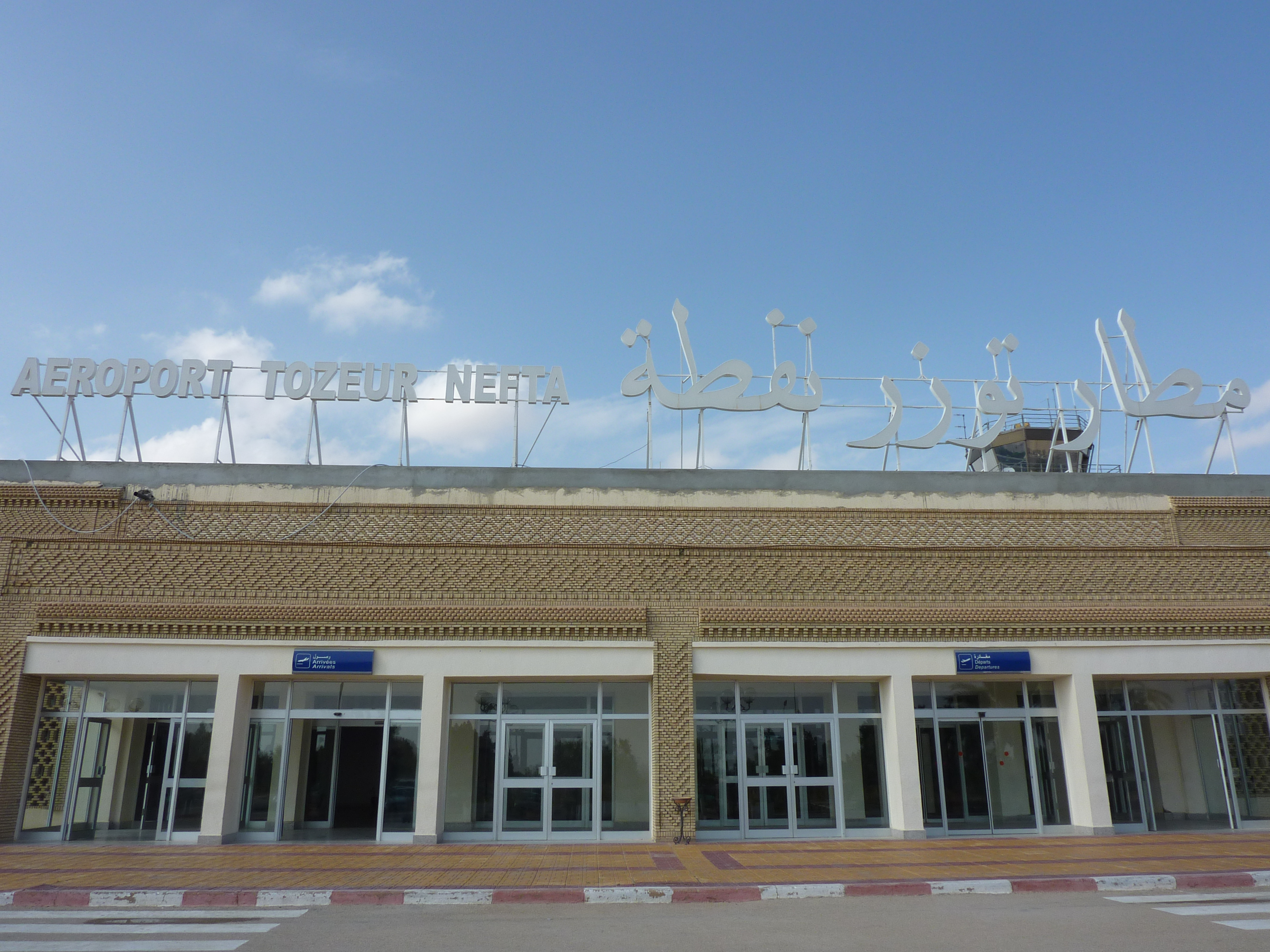
Tozeur–Nefta International Airport

The city is served by buses, taxis, railway, louage (shared or group taxi), and Tozeur–Nefta International Airport with national and international services from London, Paris, Rome and few other European countries (international flight services are mostly during the summer tourism season). Tozeur lies on the edge of the Sahara desert. Tourism activity is higher in the fall and winter months with Douz Festival among others in late December

The city is also served by a railway station that was built during the French protectorate period. it is connected to Tunisia’s national rail network via Line 13, which links it to major inland cities such as Gafsa, Métlaoui, and Sfax, and ultimately to the capital, Tunis.

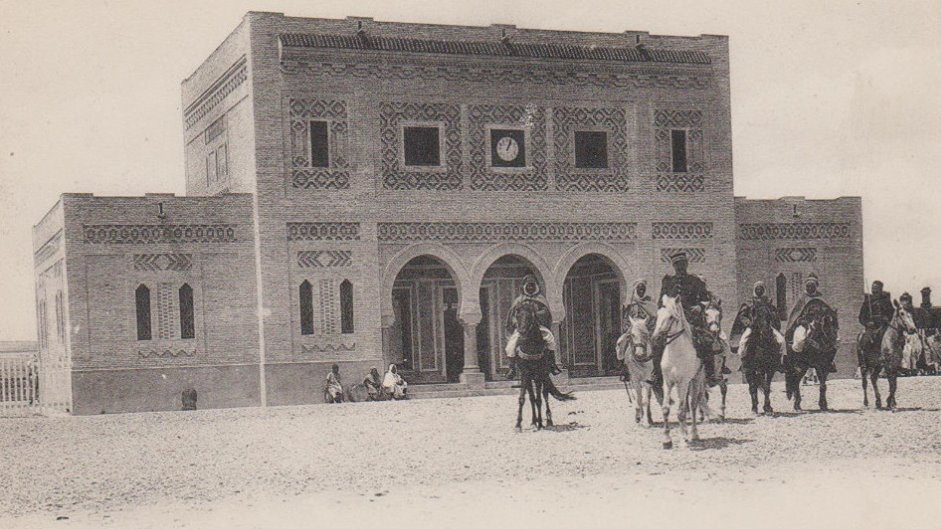
The train station in the early 1900’s

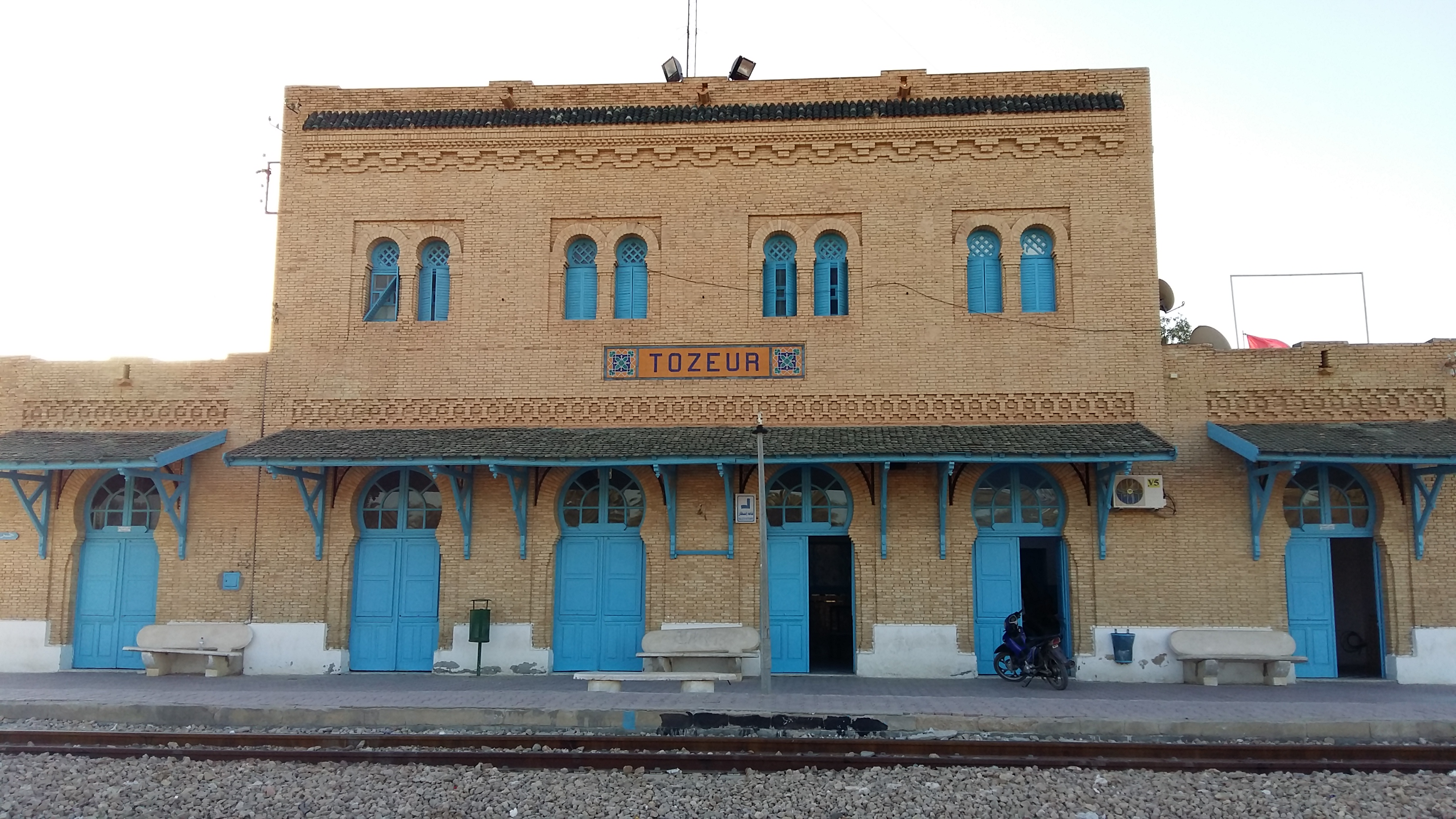

== Education ==
=== Universities ===
Tozeur contains a university campus with two institutes affiliated with Gafsa University.

- Higher Institute of Technological Studies of Tozeur (ISETT)
- Higher Institute of Applied Studies in Humanities of Tozeur (ISEAHTZ)

The city hosts a variety of educational institutions, including primary, middle and secondary schools administered by the Ministry of Education, as well as several private schools.

== People from Tozeur ==
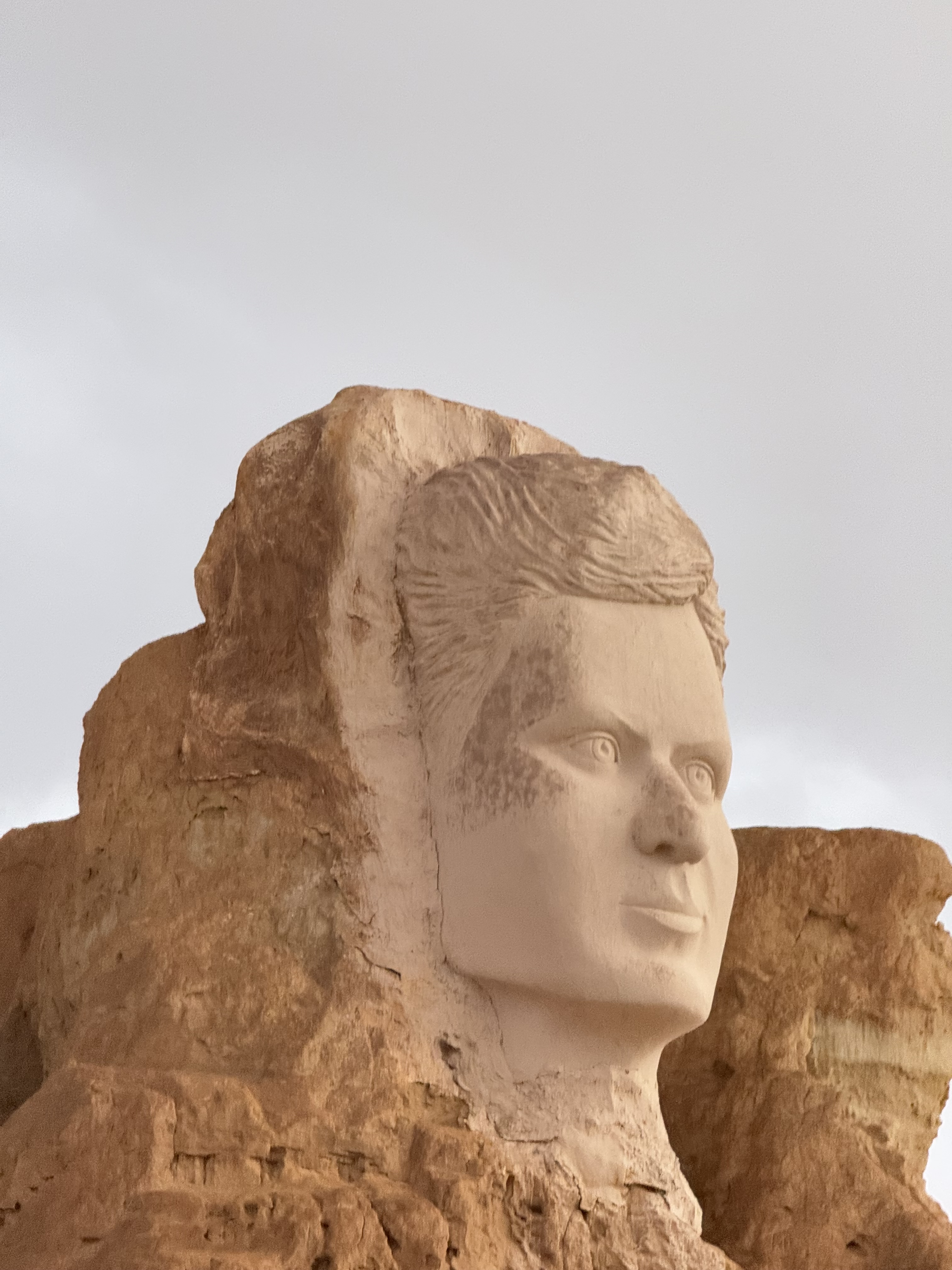
Echebbi statue at Ras El Ain Park (Tozeur)

- Aboul-Qacem Echebbi (Arabic: أبو القاسم الشابي) (Tozeur, February 1909 – 9 October 1934), was a Tunisian poet. The current Tunisian anthem is based on one of his poems.
- Abu Yazid Makhlad ibn Kayrad (Arabic: أبو يزيد مخلد بن كيراد), from the Berber Zenata tribe, nicknamed Sahib al-Himar (Arabic: صاحب الحمار), who led a mostly Berber revolution against the Fatimid ruler al-Qa'im. The revolution, almost a success, was finally crushed by the caliph al-Mansur bi-Nasr Allah.
- Ibn Chabbat (Arabic: ابن شباط), also known as Mohamed Ben Ali Ben Mohamed Ben Ali, (16 October 1221 – 17 June 1285 in Tozeur), was a writer, historian, engineer and respected Tunisian social figure in the 13th century. Ibn Chabbat's main contribution and legacy is an open surface canal system for equitable water distribution in the oasis that is still in use today.
- Rabbi Pinhas Saadoun (Arabic: ربي بنحاس سعدون), a rabbi, from one of the last Jewish communities in Tozeur.
- Ibn al-Kardabūs (13th century), jurist and historian of al-Andalus
- Isma'il Hedfi Madani (1916-1994), renowned sufi master.
- Brahim Dargouthi (born 1955), novelist. "Nafta", a city located in the governorate of Tozeur, formerly, was known as the cradle of knowledge in North Africa. It is the "Koufa" of Africa.

== Popular culture ==
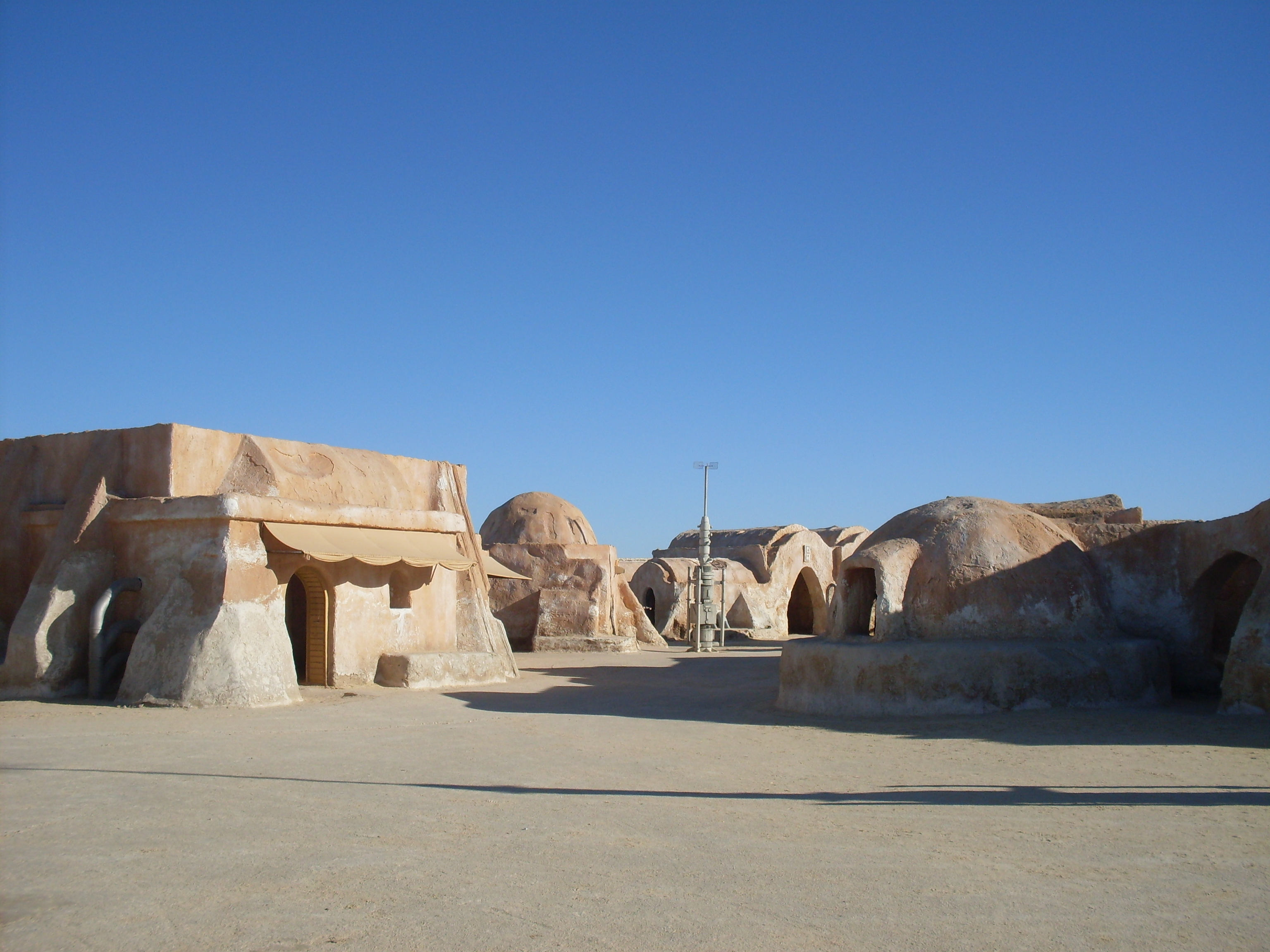
Filming location Mos Espa (Star Wars)

Tozeur was used as a filming location for the Star Wars saga and Raiders of the Lost Ark (specifically Sidi Bouhlel canyon outside the town and the salt-flats of nearby Nefta). Lucasfilm also built an entire set a few kilometers north-west of Tozeur in the middle of the desert. This set acted as Mos Espa in Star Wars: Episode I – The Phantom Menace. The buildings are still there and can be visited. The English Patient with Ralph Fiennes and Kristin Scott Thomas was partially filmed outside Tozeur.

In May 1984 the Italian singers Alice and Franco Battiato represented Italy in the Eurovision Song Contest with the song "I treni di Tozeur" ("The Trains of Tozeur"), whose lyrics contain several references to Tozeur, the historic train Le Lézard rouge and Tunisian history in general. This song became a chart hit throughout Continental Europe and Scandinavia.

== Twin towns – sister cities ==
Tozeur is twinned with:

- Beyoğlu, Turkey, since 7 June 2013
- Geestland, Germany, since 3 October 2021

== Gallery ==
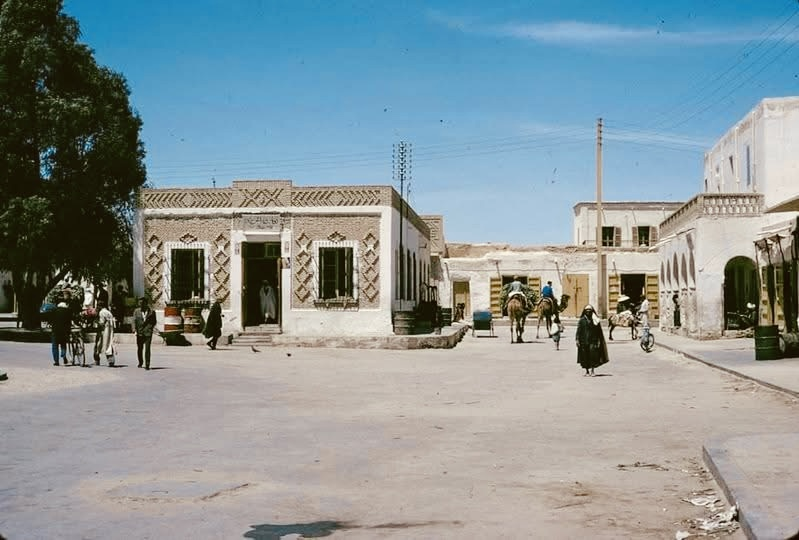
Tozeur in the 1960s

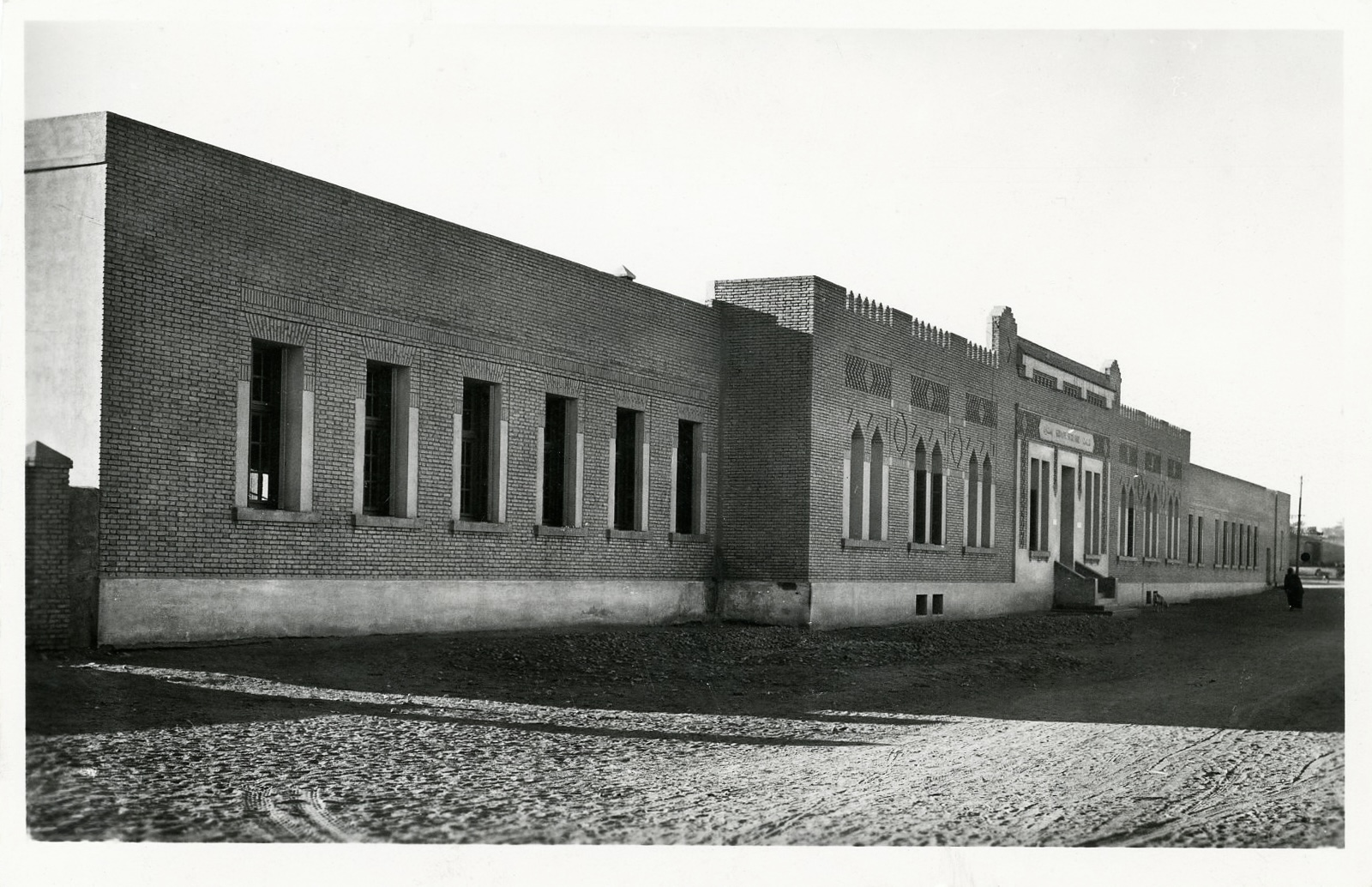
Boys’ school during the 1900s

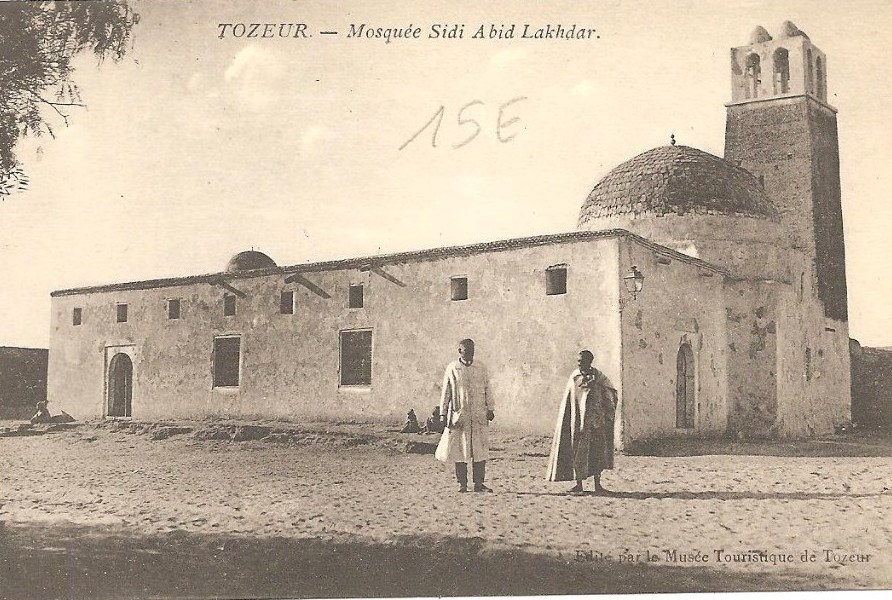
Sidi Abid Lakhdhar Mosque in the 1950s

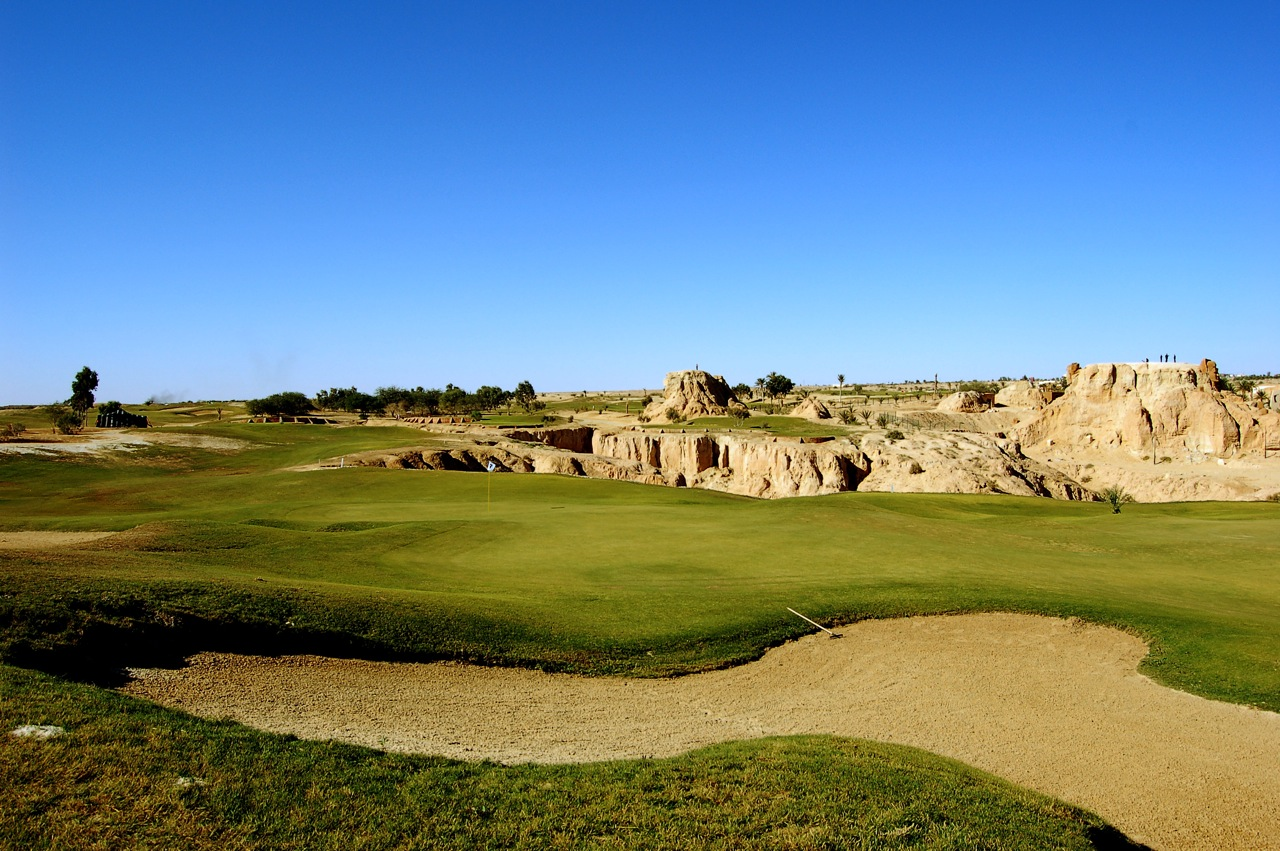
Golf Oasis Tozeur, in 2007

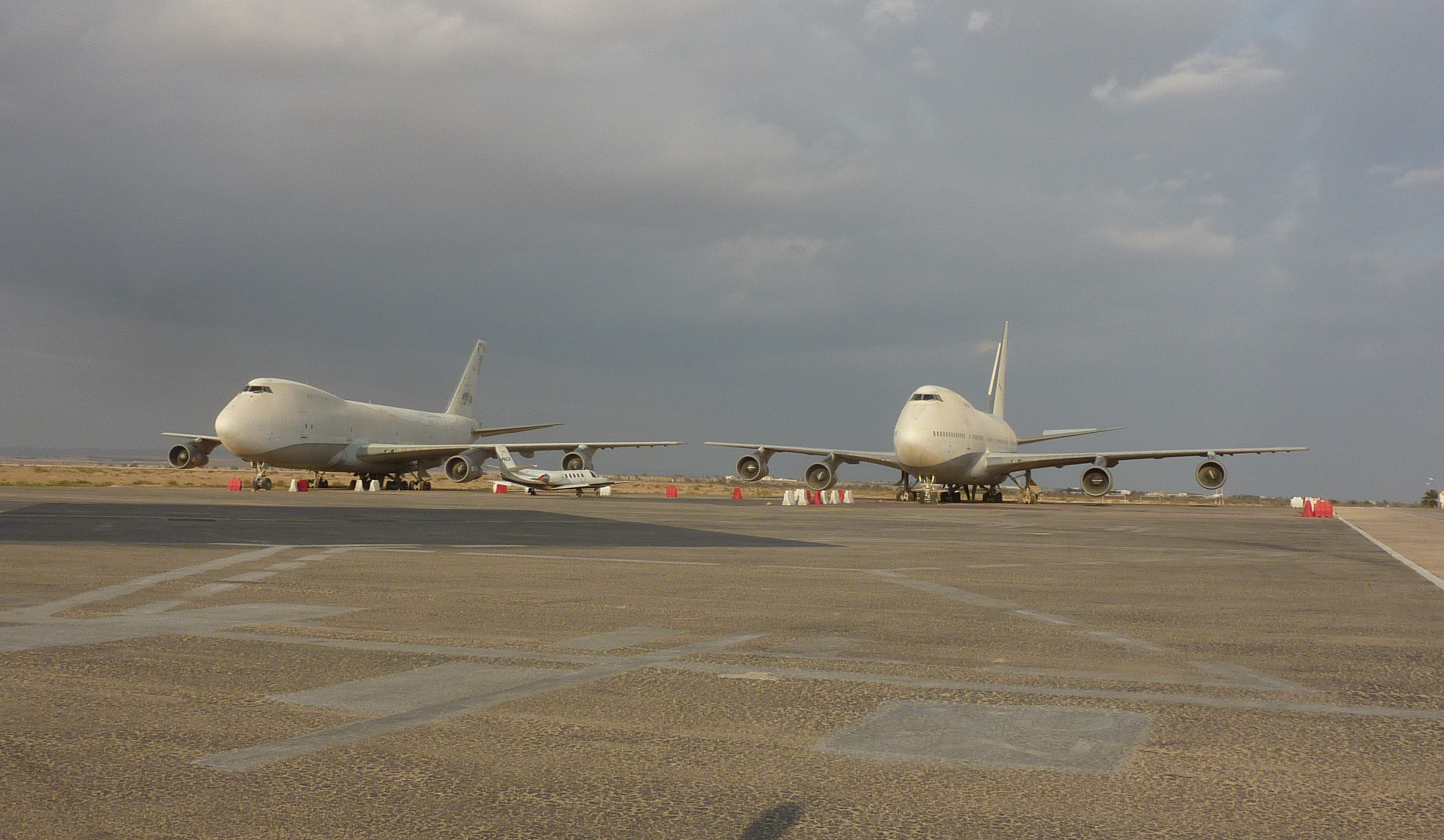
Saddam Hussein’s Boeing aircraft at Tozeur-Nefta International Airport

== See also ==
- List of Catholic dioceses in Tunisia

== Bibliography ==
- Lancel, Serge (2002). St Augustine. Norwich: Hymns Ancient and Modern Ltd. ISBN 0334028663.
- Shaw, Brent D. (2011). Sacred Violence: African Christians and Sectarian Hatred in the Age of Augustine. Cambridge University Press. p. 271. ISBN 9780521196055.

=== Ecclesiastical history ===
- Gams, Pius Bonifacius (1931). Series episcoporum Ecclesiae Catholicae (in Latin). Leipzig. p. 469.
- Morcelli, Stefano Antonio (1816). Africa christiana (in Latin). Vol. I. Brixia. pp. 341–342.
- Mesnage, Joseph (1912). L'Afrique chrétienne (in French). Paris. pp. 163–164.
