= Lupus band test =

Medical test

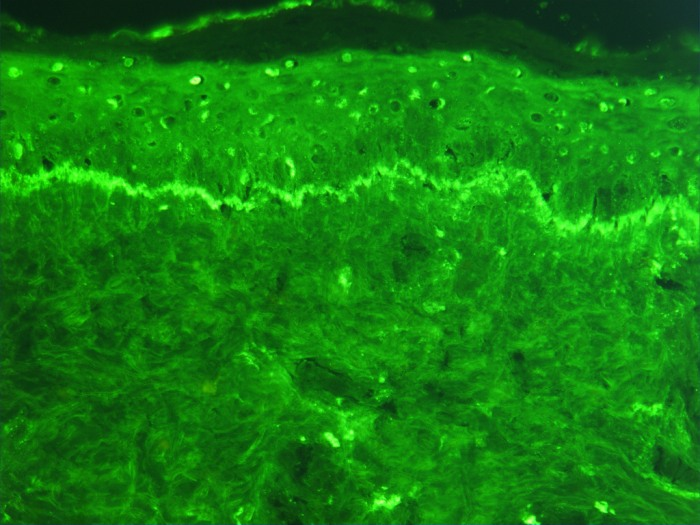
- Microphotograph of a histological section of human skin prepared for direct immunofluorescence using an anti-IgG antibody. The skin is from a person with systemic lupus erythematosus and shows IgG deposits at two different places: The first is a bandlike deposit along the epidermal basement membrane ("lupus band test" is positive); the second is within the nuclei of the epidermal cells (antinuclear antibodies are present).
- Purpose: distinguish different types of lupus

Lupus band test is done upon skin biopsy, with direct immunofluorescence staining, in which, if positive, IgG and complement depositions are found at the dermoepidermal junction. This test can be helpful in distinguishing systemic lupus erythematosus (SLE) from cutaneous lupus, because in SLE the lupus band test will be positive in both involved and uninvolved skin, whereas with cutaneous lupus only the involved skin will be positive.

The minimum criteria for positivity are:

- In sun-exposed skin: presence of a band of deposits of IgM along the epidermal basement membrane in 50% of the biopsy, intermediate (2+) intensity or more.
- In sun-protected skin : presence of interrupted (i.e. less than 50%) deposits of IgM along the epidermal basement membrane, intermediate (2+) intensity or more.

The presence of other immunoglobulins (especially IgA) and/or complement proteins (especially C4) increases the specificity of a positive test.

== See also ==
- Lupus erythematosus
- Skin lesion
