= Brahim Dargouthi =

Brahim Dargouthi, or Darghouthi (in Arabic ابراهيم درغوثي), (Tozeur, 21 December 1955) is a Tunisian, author of short stories and novels. A graduate of the Ecole Normale of teachers of Tunis in 1975, he taught in various schools and is the director of a primary school in Moularés Gafsa in 2013. He is also a member of the steering committee of the Union of Tunisian Writers (Ittiḥād al-kuttāb al-tūnisiyyīna) and leads its industry Gafsa. Dargouthi is 460th in Arabian Business' ranking of the 500 most influential Arabs.

== Short stories ==
- (in Arabic) al-Nakhl yamūtu wāqifan (Palm trees die erect), Publishing Samed, Sfax, 1989
- (in Arabic) al-Khubz al-murr (Bitter bread), Publishing Samed, Sfax, 1990
- (in Arabic) Rajul muḥtaram jiddan (A very respectful man), Publishing Samed Sahar, Tunis, 1995
- (in Arabic) Kaʿsuka yā maṭar (To your health, rain), Tunis: Sahr editions 1997
- (in Arabic) Manāzil al-kalām (Houses of talks), Tunis: ichrak editions, 2009
- (in Arabic) Good night: anthology of short stories, cultural publishing and distribution ( Monastir 2012)

== Novels ==
- (in Arabic) al-Darāwīsh yaʾūdūna ilā al-manfā (Dervishes return to banned lands)), first ed., London: Riadh Arraies editions, 1992; second ed., Tunis: Sahr editions, 1998; third ed., Tunis: The Mediterranean editions, 2006.
- (in Arabic) al-Qiyāma… al-āna (And now... Resurrection), first ed. Syrya: Alhiwar editions, 1994; second ed., Tunis : sahar editions, 1999.
- (in Arabic) Shabābīk muntaṣaf al-layl (Midnight windows), first ed., Tunis: sahar editions, 1996; second ed. Sousse : Almaarif editions, 2008.
- (in Arabic) Asrār ṣāḥib al-sitr (The secrets of the Jackets owner), first ed., Sfax: samed editions, 1998; second ed., on author's own expenses, 2009.
- (in Arabic) Warāʿ as-sarāb... qalīlan (A little behind the Mirage), first ed., Sliana: Alathaf editions, 2002; second ed. Egypt : Center for Arab civilization.
- (in Arabic) The facts of what happened to a woman with golden clog, Tunisian house editing / tunis 2012
