= Asellicus of Tusuros =

Asellicus of Tusuros was a 4th-century bishop of Tusuros, a Roman Town in what was Roman North Africa. He is known for being outspoken at the Council of Carthage of 411 and from a number of epistles with Augustine and Donatian of Reims.

In late antiquity Tusuros was on the Limes Tripolitanus adjoining the Sahara. Strabo described the area as like a leopard's skin, spotted with inhabited places ... that are surrounded by waterless and desert land. This tough and remote location was home to numerous Christian beliefs that were divergent from mainstream Catholicism.

Asellicus was forced to address Donatist, Manichaeist, Judaising and Peligalianist groups within his town.

Tusuros was located in the heartland of the Donatist movement, with many of his neighbouring bishops being leaders of that movement. In 411 he and Aptus, his Donatist rival at Tusuros travelled to the Council of Carthage (411) where Asellicus was keen to express his opinion on several matters.

There was a community of Jews in Tusuros some of whom who appear to have proselytised. it is unclear however, if the movement came from the Jews themselves or from a section of the gentile church or a combination, but there was for a time a strong move to adopt Old Testament dietary and religious observance, both at Tusuros and nearby at Thuburiscu. Asellicus sought the assistance of Augustine, and we have several of their letters, on this matter.
