= Alfredo Sadun =

American ophthalmologist (born 1950)

Alfredo Arrigo Sadun
- Born: October 23, 1950 (age 76); New Orleans, Louisiana
- Occupations: Ophthalmologist, academic, author and researcher
- Awards: B. Straatsma Award, AAO and AUPO for Residency Education; W. Hoyt Award for Neuro-ophthalmology, AAO and NANOS; Life Achievement Award, AAO; Gold Medal Fellow, ARVO

Academic background
- Education: B.Sc., Biology; Ph.D., Neuroscience; M.D., Medicine
- Alma mater: Massachusetts Institute of Technology (M.I.T.); Albert Einstein College of Medicine; Harvard Medical School

Academic work
- Institutions: UCLA School of Medicine; Estelle Doheny Eye Institute

Alfredo Arrigo Sadun (born October 23, 1950) is an American ophthalmologist, academic, author and researcher. He holds the Flora L. Thornton Endowed Chair and is chief of ophthalmology at Doheny Eye Centers and Vice-Chair of Ophthalmology at UCLA.

Sadun has received recognition for his work in neuro-ophthalmology and especially in diseases of the optic nerve. He has published over 450 peer-reviewed articles and has 5 patents awarded. He is the author of 5 books, entitled Optics for Ophthalmologists: A Board-Review Manual, Neuroprotection: Implication for Eye Disease, New Methods of Sensory Visual Testing, Ophthalmology, and Atlas of Leber’s Hereditary Optic Neuropathy. His publications have been cited over 27,000 times, and his h-index is 90.

Sadun is a Gold Fellow of the Association for Research in Vision and Ophthalmology (ARVO). and the editor-in-chief of Perspective for the American Academy of Ophthalmology.

== Early life and education ==
Sadun was born in New Orleans, LA in 1950 to Elvio Sadun a prominent parasitologist and Lina O. Sadun, a geneticist. Both were refugees who escaped Italy during the Holocaust. Sadun received his bachelor's degree in biology from the Massachusetts Institute of Technology (MIT) in 1972. He then enrolled at Albert Einstein College of Medicine, and earned a Doctoral degree in Neuroscience and a Doctorate of Medicine (MD) in 1976 and 1978, respectively.

== Career ==
Following his postdoctoral fellowship, Sadun held an appointment as instructor in ophthalmology at Harvard School of Medicine in 1983, and became assistant professor of ophthalmology in the following year. In 1984, he joined the University of Southern California as an assistant professor, and was promoted to associate professor in 1987, and to professor in 1990 and the Thornton Chair in 2000. Since 2014, he has been professor in the Department of Ophthalmology at the University of California in Los Angeles (UCLA).

He is currently the Flora L. Thornton Endowed Chair, Chief of Ophthalmology at Doheny Eye Centers-UCLA, and vice-chair of ophthalmology at UCLA.

Sadun organized and was the inaugural president of the Council of Program Directors for the AUPO. He was also the inaugural recipient of the AUPO/AAO's combined Straatsma Award.

Sadun trained about 50 clinical and science fellows and, as director of residency training at Doheny/USC/LAC, supervised the ophthalmology training of nearly 200 residents.

== Research ==
Sadun has focused his research on diseases of the optic nerve, diseases of mitochondrial impairment, optic nerve regeneration, and neuro-protection. He has also worked and published on optic neuropathies, orbital disease, and the basic science underlying problems in neuro-ophthalmology. He has received about 20 national and international awards for his contributions to science and medicine.

=== Vision neuroscience/neuro ophthalmology ===
Sadun maintains an active laboratory at the Doheny Vision Research Center. In the 1980s, Sadun was the first to apply a new tract-tracing technique to establish nine anatomical pathways between the eye and various parts of the brain. He was the first to describe a human retinal projection to the hypothalamus that subserves the visual entrainment of the circadian rhythm. In 1993, he was selected and sponsored by the United Nations to lead an investigative team to determine the cause of an epidemic of optic neuropathy in Cuba. This work led to further investigations into the role of mitochondria in optic neuropathies due to injury from nutritional, toxic, and genetic causes. The story of how Sadun led a team of investigators to solve the mystery of this blinding epidemic and its resolution has been written into a book by Dr. Bruce Shields.

=== Alzheimer's disease ===
Sadun was the first to identify an optic neuropathy associated with Alzheimer's disease, and to highlight evidence of degeneration in the optic nerves and retinas of Alzheimer Disease (AD) patients. He based his study on light-microscopic and ultrastructural characteristics of ganglion cell degeneration in the retinas of patients with Alzheimer's disease (AD), and found out that degeneration in the retinal ganglion cells (RGCs) is characterized by a vacuolated, ‘frothy’ appearance of the cytoplasm. In morphometric analysis of the retinas of Alzheimer's disease patients, he demonstrated that the optic nerve initially showed predominant loss of the largest class of retinal ganglion cells (M-cells) that contribute large caliber fibers to the optic nerve.

=== Leber's hereditary optic neuropathy (LHON) ===
Sadun has conducted several projects regarding LHON, such as gene therapy trials, small molecule therapy (eye drops and injections), histopathological analysis and a project using Artificial Intelligence with OCTA that can identify who is a carrier of LHON. With the collaboration of Dr. Valerio Carelli, studying cybrid cell cultures, they noted that the major consequence of the mitochondrial dysfunction in all three LHON mtDNA mutations was not deficiencies in ATP production, but rather great increases of reactive oxygen species (ROS). Furthermore, he has led eighteen yearly international field investigations to Brazil for studying the world's largest pedigree of LHON, and established the role of environmental factors, such as heavy drinking and smoking, to trigger LHON conversion. In these and other studies, he has also investigated the role of mitochondria in aging and disease in the brain, optic nerve and retina.

== Major awards and honors ==
- 1993 - Honor Award, American Academy of Ophthalmology (AAO)
- 1999 - Pizart Award for Vision Research, Lighthouse International
- 2001 - B. Straatsma Award, AAO and AUPO for Residency Education
- 2002 - Secretariat Honor Award, AAO
- 2004 - Senior Honor Award, AAO
- 2009 - Fellow (silver medal), Association for Research in Vision and Ophthalmology (ARVO)
- 2012 - W. Hoyt Award for Neuro-ophthalmology, AAO and NANOS
- 2014 - Heed Award for Excellence in Academic Ophthalmology, AAO
- 2016 - Purpura Award as Lifetime Achievement in Medical Science, Albert Einstein College of Medicine
- 2017 - Life Achievement Award, AAO
- 2020 - Secretariat Honor Award, AAO
- 2020 - Gold Medal Fellow, ARVO

== Bibliography ==
=== Books ===
- Optics for Ophthalmologists: A Board-Review Manual (1987) ISBN 9781461248101
- Neuroprotection: Implication for the Eye Disease (2002)
- New Methods of Sensory Visual Testing (2012) ISBN 9781461388357
- Ophthalmology, 5th Edition (2018) ISBN 9780323528191
- Atlas of Leber’s Hereditary Optic Neuropathy (2019)

=== Selected articles ===
- Sadun, Alfredo A.; Schaechter, Judith D.; Smith, Lois E.H. (June 1984). "A retinohypothalamic pathway in man: Light mediation of circadian rhythms". Brain Research. 302 (2): 371–377. doi:10.1016/0006-8993(84)90252-x. PMID 6733517.
- Hinton, David R.; Sadun, Alfredo A.; Blanks, Janet C.; Miller, Carol A. (21 August 1986). "Optic-Nerve Degeneration in Alzheimer's Disease". New England Journal of Medicine. 315 (8): 485–487. doi:10.1056/NEJM198608213150804. PMID 3736630.
- Sadun, Alfredo A.; Bassi, Carl J. (January 1990). "Optic Nerve Damage in Alzheimer's Disease". Ophthalmology. 97 (1): 9–17. doi:10.1016/s0161-6420(90)32621-0. PMID 2314849.
- Grunberg, Steven M.; Weiss, Martin H.; Spitz, Irving M.; Ahmadi, Jamshid; Sadun, Alfredo; Russell, Christy A.; Lucci, Lois; Stevenson, Lani L. (June 1991). "Treatment of unresectable meningiomas with the antiprogesterone agent mifepristone". Journal of Neurosurgery. 74 (6): 861–866. doi:10.3171/jns.1991.74.6.0861. PMID 2033444.
- Sadun, A. A.; Martone, J. F.; Muci-Mendoza, R.; Reyes, L.; DuBois, L.; Silva, J. C.; Roman, G.; Caballero, B. (May 1994). "Epidemic optic neuropathy in Cuba. Eye findings". Archives of Ophthalmology. 112 (5): 691–699. doi:10.1001/archopht.1994.01090170139037. PMID 8185530.
- Smith, Ronald E.; Sadun, Alfredo A. (23 April 1998). "Clearing the Cornea with Nerve Growth Factor". New England Journal of Medicine. 338 (17): 1222–1223. doi:10.1056/NEJM199804233381710. PMID 9554865.
- Sadun, A. A.; Win, P. H.; Ross-Cisneros, F. N.; Walker, S. O.; Carelli, V. (2000). "Leber's hereditary optic neuropathy differentially affects smaller axons in the optic nerve". Transactions of the American Ophthalmological Society. 98: 223–232, discussion 232–235. PMC 1298228. PMID 11190025.
- Sadun, Alfredo A; Carelli, Valerio; Salomao, Solange R; Berezovsky, Adriana; Quiros, Peter A; Sadun, Federico; DeNegri, Anna-Maria; Andrade, Rafael; Moraes, Milton; Passos, Angelo; Kjaer, PatrÍcia; Pereira, Josenilson; Valentino, Maria Lucia; Schein, Stan; Belfort, Rubens (August 2003). "Extensive investigation of a large Brazilian pedigree of 11778/haplogroup J Leber hereditary optic neuropathy". American Journal of Ophthalmology. 136 (2): 231–238. doi:10.1016/s0002-9394(03)00099-0. PMID 12888043.
- Carelli, Valerio; Ross-Cisneros, Fred N.; Sadun, Alfredo A. (January 2004). "Mitochondrial dysfunction as a cause of optic neuropathies". Progress in Retinal and Eye Research. 23 (1): 53–89. doi:10.1016/j.preteyeres.2003.10.003. PMID 14766317.
- Pan, Billy X.; Ross-Cisneros, Fred N.; Carelli, Valerio; Rue, Kelly S.; Salomao, Solange R.; Moraes-Filho, Milton N.; Moraes, Milton N.; Berezovsky, Adriana; Belfort, Rubens; Sadun, Alfredo A. (9 November 2012). "Mathematically Modeling the Involvement of Axons in Leber's Hereditary Optic Neuropathy". Investigative Ophthalmology & Visual Science. 53 (12): 7608–7617. doi:10.1167/iovs.12-10452. PMC 3495603. PMID 23060142.
- Lin, Chun Shi; Sharpley, Mark S.; Fan, Weiwei; Waymire, Katrina G.; Sadun, Alfredo A.; Carelli, Valerio; Ross-Cisneros, Fred N.; Baciu, Peter; Sung, Eric; McManus, Meagan J.; Pan, Billy X.; Gil, Daniel W.; Macgregor, Grant R.; Wallace, Douglas C. (4 December 2012). "Mouse mtDNA mutant model of Leber hereditary optic neuropathy". Proceedings of the National Academy of Sciences of the United States of America. 109 (49): 20065–20070. doi:10.1073/pnas.1217113109. PMC 3523873. PMID 23129651.
- Zaninello, Marta; Palikaras, Konstantinos; Naon, Deborah; Iwata, Keiko; Herkenne, Stephanie; Quintana-Cabrera, Ruben; Semenzato, Martina; Grespi, Francesca; Ross-Cisneros, Fred N.; Carelli, Valerio; Sadun, Alfredo A.; Tavernarakis, Nektarios; Scorrano, Luca (12 August 2020). "Inhibition of autophagy curtails visual loss in a model of autosomal dominant optic atrophy". Nature Communications. 11 (1) 4029. Bibcode:2020NatCo..11.4029Z. doi:10.1038/s41467-020-17821-1. PMC 7423926. PMID 32788597.
- Fuller, Jack T.; Barnes, Steven; Sadun, Lorenzo A.; Ajmera, Pujan; Alexandrova, Anastassia N.; Sadun, Alfredo A. (26 September 2023). "Coenzyme Q10 trapping in mitochondrial complex I underlies Leber's hereditary optic neuropathy". Proceedings of the National Academy of Sciences. 120 (39) e2304884120. Bibcode:2023PNAS..12004884F. doi:10.1073/pnas.2304884120. PMC 10523484. PMID 37733737.
