= Youssef Seddik (philosopher) =

Tunisian philosopher and anthropologist, born in 1943

- يوسف الصديق
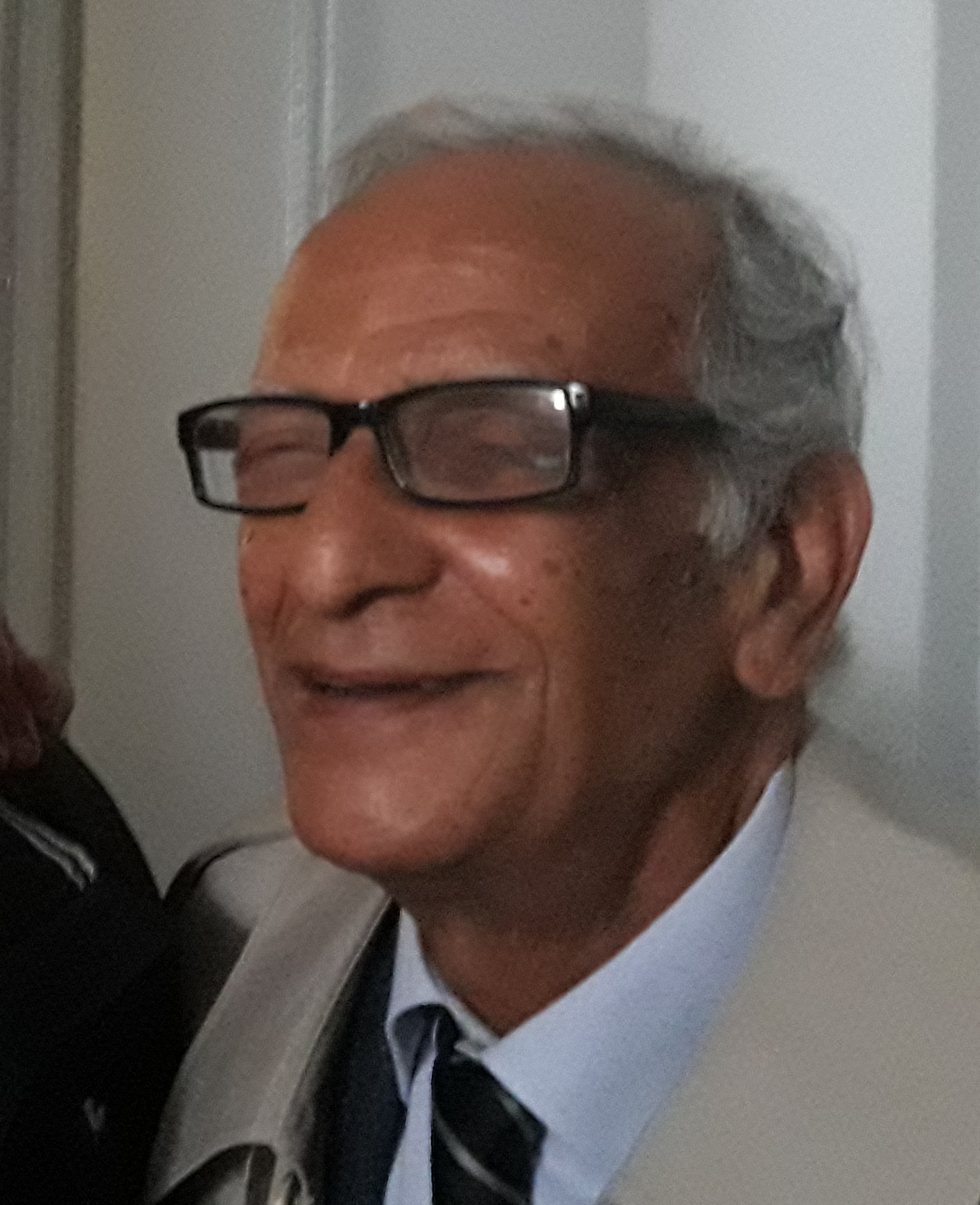
- Born: 1943 (age 82–83); Tozeur, Tunisia
- Occupations: Philosopher and anthropologist

Youssef Seddik (Tunisian Arabic: يوسف الصديق) (born in 1943 in Tozeur) is a noted Tunisian philosopher and anthropologist specializing in Ancient Greece and the anthropology of the Qur'an.

== Biography ==
In 1966, he obtained a master's degree in philosophy and a degree in French literature and civilization. During the next four years, he taught at the French school in Compiègne in 1967 and obtained a DES (diplôme d'études supérieures, roughly equivalent to an MA) in Philosophy and a degree in Ancient Greece.

From 1971 to 1977 he taught philosophy in secondary schools in Tunisia and at the University of Paris III: Sorbonne Nouvelle, before becoming director of a publishing company specializing in books for young people between 1984 and 1987. He was also a reporter of the journal La Presse de Tunisie between 1975 and 1983.

Based in Paris in 1988, he obtained a DEA in the Greek language and civilization from the University of Paris III: Sorbonne Nouvelle (1988) and a doctorate at the École des hautes études en sciences sociales (1995). He lectured there and also in modern Islamic philosophy at the Sorbonne from 1995 to 1996.

Seddik has published books and translations about Ancient Greece and Islamic heritage, including works related to Muhammad, Imam Ali, and the Qur'an. He also attempted to publish a Qur'an in the form of seven volumes of comics, but was halted after objections from the Tunisian religious authorities in 1992.

In 1999 he published a book entitled Brins de chicane. La vie quotidienne à Bagdad au Xe siècle about daily life in Baghdad in the tenth century. His book, Nous n'avons jamais lu le Coran, released in September 2004 explores the language and symbols that are present in the Koran. In the book the author begins with the questioning of the politics of Islam and the role of God.

He also directed documentaries including a series of five episodes on Muhammad.

== Publications ==
- Éloge du commerce (editing and translation of Ibn 'Alî al-Dimashqî's book), ed. MédiaCom, Tunis, 1994
- Penser l'économique, éd. MédiaCom, Tunis, 1995
- L’Abaissé. Première somme de la jurisprudence islamique (editing and translation of the book of Mâlik ibn Anas), ed. MédiaCom, Tunis, 1996
- Épîtres d’Avicenne et de Bryson (Translation with Yassine Essid), ed. MédiaCom, Tunis, 1996
- Dictionnaire historique de la pensée économique arabe et musulmane (With the collaboration of Yassine Essid), ed. MédiaCom, Tunis, 1998
- Brins de chicane. La vie quotidienne à Bagdad au Xe siècle (editing and translation of Tanûkhî's book), ed. Actes Sud, Arles, 1999 (ISBN 9782742716913)
- De l'interprétation des rêves (editing and translation of Muḥammad 'Ibn Sīrīn's book), éd. Al-Bouraq, Beyrouth, 1999
- Dits de l'imam Ali, ed. Actes Sud, Arles, 2000 (ISBN 9782742727384)
- Le Coran : autre lecture, autre traduction, ed. L'Aube, La Tour d'Aigues, 2002 (ISBN 9782752602114)
- Dits du prophète Muhammad, ed. Actes Sud, Arles, 2002 (ISBN 9782742736812)
- L'arrivant du soir : cet islam de lumière qui peine à devenir, ed. L'Aube, La Tour d'Aigues, 2004 (ISBN 9782752603821)
- Nous n'avons jamais lu le Coran, ed. L'Aube, La Tour d'Aigues, 2004 (ISBN 9782752600264)
- Qui sont les barbares ? : Itinéraire d'un penseur d'islam, ed. L'Aube, La Tour d'Aigues, 2007 (ISBN 9782752603838)
- Le Grand malentendu. L'Occident face au Coran, ed. L'Aube, La Tour d'Aigues, 2010 (ISBN 9782815900706)
- Unissons-nous ! Des révolutions arabes aux indignés (Interview with Gilles Vanderpooten), ed. L'Aube, La Tour d'Aigues, 2011
- Tunisie, la Révolution inachevée (Interview with Gilles Vanderpooten), ed. L'Aube, La Tour d'Aigues, 2014 (ISBN 281591008X)
- Ce que le Coran doit à la Bible : un dialogue contemporain sur l'islam et le judaïsme (With Isy Morgensztern), Paris, La Découverte, 2018
