= Saadoun al-Tikriti =

Iraqi politician

Saadoun al-Tikriti (سعدون خليفة مهدي التكريتي; 1930–1958) was an Iraqi politician. He was a Communist from Tikrit, a predominantly Baath town. According to author Con Coughlin, he was murdered by Saddam Hussein in Tikrit in October 1958 as requested by the future president's uncle, Khairallah Talfah. Both Hussein and his uncle were arrested and jailed for six months but eventually released due to a lack of evidence. He is said to have been the first person murdered by Hussein.
