= Elvio Sadun =

American parasitologist (1918–1974)

- Born: December 9, 1918; Livorno, Italy
- Died: April 23, 1974 (aged 55); Washington, D.C., U.S.
- Known for: Schistosomiasis, malaria
- Children: Alfredo Sadun, Alberto Sadun, Lorenzo Sadun
- Awards: Henry Baldwin Ward Medal in 1961
- Scientific career
- Fields: Tropical medicine

Elvio Herbert Sadun (December 9, 1918 – April 23, 1974) was an Italian-American parasitologist. Educated at Harvard and Johns Hopkins University (ScD, zoology), he conducted most of his research as Chief of Medical Zoology at the Walter Reed Army Institute of Research (1959–1973). A prolific scientist, he wrote or edited 3 books and 313 peer-reviewed articles in the fields of immunology and tropical medicine, and is known for the first application of fluorescent antibody imaging in the diagnosis of parasitic diseases.

== Life ==
Memorial plaque in honour of Elvio Sadun in the library of the International Livestock Research Institute, Nairobi

Sadun was born in Livorno, Italy to a prominent Jewish family. As a Jew, Sadun escaped from Italy and immigrated to the U.S. in 1939 where he began graduate work in zoology at Harvard University. The outbreak of World War II brought him back to Italy with the US Army, and he became director of the Italian Radio Network under Allied Command, which would later become part of the Armed Forces Network. This was a means for him to stay in constant communication with the Italian partisans and allowed him to communicate secret instructions for the surrender of the Italian Navy in Malta. He accomplished this as a sergeant in the Army at the time of the surrender.

After the war, Sadun returned to Johns Hopkins and became a parasitologist. He married Lina Ottolenghi, another Italian Jewish refugee, in 1949. They had three children, Alfredo, Alberto, and Lorenzo, all of whom became university academics. In 1974, shortly after founding the International Laboratory for Research on Animal Diseases in Nairobi, he died from liver cancer in Washington, D.C. The Elvio Sadun Library at the International Livestock Research Institute in Nairobi is named in his honour.

== Research ==
Sadun's major research was on the human immunologic reaction to parasitic diseases, or more precisely, host-parasite immunological interactions. Sadun made seminal contributions to the epidemiology of several parasitic diseases, immunodiagnostic methods, and was among the first to explore host-parasite relations. He also defined several epidemiological events and helped manage outbreaks of Opisthorchis viverrini in Thailand (1952–1953), of Schistosomiasis japonica in Japan (1957–1958), and of Schistosomiasis haematobia in Egypt (1970). In 1960, he and two other researchers were the first to apply a recently developed technique, fluorescent antibody imaging, to the diagnosis of schistosomiasis.

Sadun held faculty positions at several universities before joining the U.S. Public Health Service and later the Centers for Disease Control (CDC). He became Chief of Zoology at the Walter Reed Army Institute of Research (WRAIR) where he conducted investigations in many areas of parasitology, and managed the US Malaria program. He helped to organize and fund, through WRAIR, a major program for basic and applied research in malaria in the mid 1960s which led to at least two effective antimalarial therapies. In 1972 he organized, with support from the Ford and Rockefeller Foundations, a number of countries into a consortium to form a major new institute: The International Laboratory for Research on Animal Diseases (ILRAD) in Nairobi, Africa. Sadun became the founding director shortly before he died.

== Awards ==
Sadun received four major medals for his research in parasitology and tropical medicine. In 1961 he received the Henry Baldwin Ward Medal, the highest award of the American Society of Parasitologists. In 1968 he received the Department of the Army Decoration for Exceptional Civilian Service, in 1973 he received the Helminthological Society of Washington's Anniversary Award, and in 1974 he was posthumously awarded the Department of Defense Distinguished Civilian Service Award. In 1999, a tree was dedicated in his honor in the Jerusalem Peace Forest by Italian president Carlo Azeglio Ciampi.
