= Antinuclear antibody =

Autoantibody that binds to contents of the cell nucleus

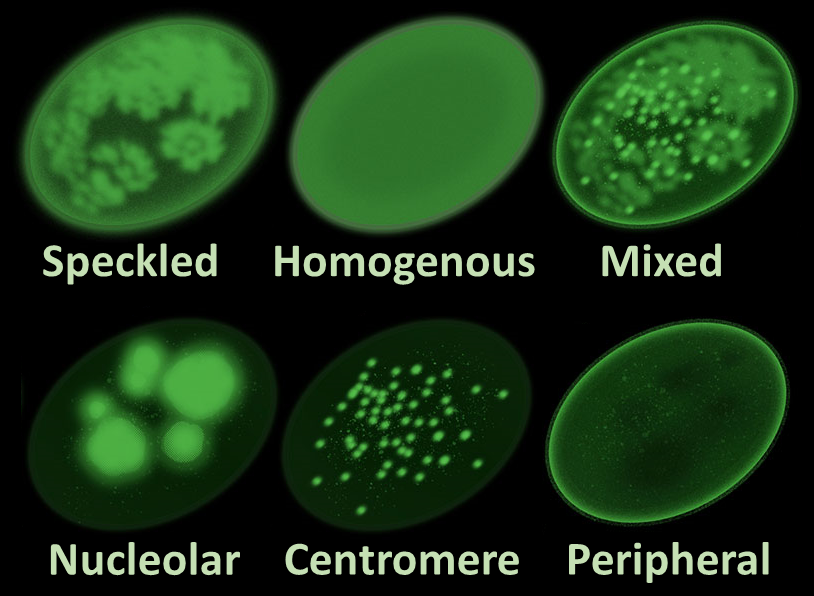
Main antinuclear antibody patterns on immunofluorescence

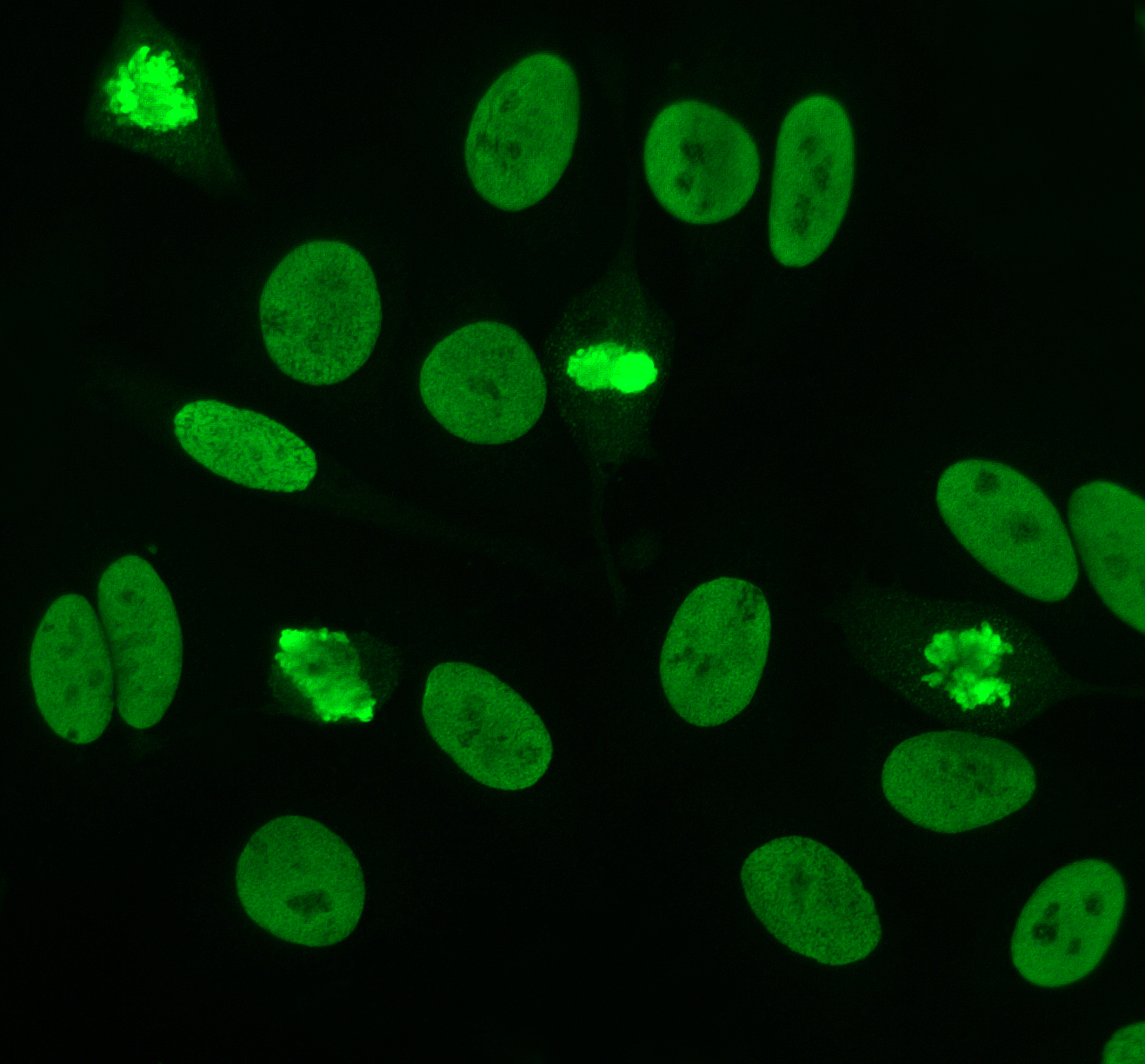
Homogeneous immunofluorescence staining pattern of double stranded DNA antibodies on HEp-20-10 cells. Interphase cells show homogeneous nuclear staining while mitotic cells show staining of the condensed chromosome regions.

Antinuclear antibodies (ANAs, also known as antinuclear factor or ANF) are autoantibodies that bind to contents of the cell nucleus. In normal individuals, the immune system produces antibodies to foreign proteins (antigens) but not to human proteins (autoantigens). In some cases, antibodies to human antigens are produced; these are known as autoantibodies.

There are many subtypes of ANAs such as anti-Ro antibodies, anti-La antibodies, anti-Sm antibodies, anti-nRNP antibodies, anti-Scl-70 antibodies, anti-dsDNA antibodies, anti-histone antibodies, antibodies to nuclear pore complexes, anti-centromere antibodies and anti-sp100 antibodies. Each of these antibody subtypes binds to different proteins or protein complexes within the nucleus. They are found in many disorders including autoimmunity, cancer and infection, with different prevalences of antibodies depending on the condition. This allows the use of ANAs in the diagnosis of some autoimmune disorders, including systemic lupus erythematosus, Sjögren syndrome, scleroderma, mixed connective tissue disease, polymyositis, dermatomyositis, autoimmune hepatitis and drug-induced lupus.

The ANA test detects the autoantibodies present in an individual's blood serum. The common tests used for detecting and quantifying ANAs are indirect immunofluorescence and enzyme-linked immunosorbent assay (ELISA). In immunofluorescence, the level of autoantibodies is reported as a titre. This is the highest dilution of the serum at which autoantibodies are still detectable. Positive autoantibody titres at a dilution equal to or greater than 1:160 are usually considered as clinically significant. Positive titres of less than 1:160 are present in up to 20% of the healthy population, especially the elderly. Although positive titres of 1:160 or higher are strongly associated with autoimmune disorders, they are also found in 5% of healthy individuals. Autoantibody screening is useful in the diagnosis of autoimmune disorders and monitoring levels helps to predict the progression of disease. A positive ANA test is seldom useful if other clinical or laboratory data supporting a diagnosis are not present.

== Immunity and autoimmunity ==
The human body has many defense mechanisms against pathogens, one of which is humoral immunity. This defence mechanism produces antibodies (large glycoproteins) in response to an immune stimulus. Many cells of the immune system are required for this process, including lymphocytes (T-cells and B-cells) and antigen presenting cells. These cells coordinate an immune response upon the detection of foreign proteins (antigens), producing antibodies that bind to these antigens. In normal physiology, lymphocytes that recognise human proteins (autoantigens) either undergo programmed cell death (apoptosis) or become non-functional. This self-tolerance means that lymphocytes should not incite an immune response against human cellular antigens. Sometimes, however, this process malfunctions and antibodies are produced against human antigens, which may lead to autoimmune disease.

== ANA subtypes ==
ANAs are found in many disorders, as well as some healthy individuals. These disorders include: systemic lupus erythematosus (SLE), rheumatoid arthritis, Sjögren syndrome, scleroderma, polymyositis, dermatomyositis, primary biliary cirrhosis, drug induced lupus, autoimmune hepatitis, multiple sclerosis, discoid lupus, thyroid disease, antiphospholipid syndrome, juvenile idiopathic arthritis, psoriatic arthritis, juvenile dermatomyositis, idiopathic thrombocytopaenic purpura, infection and cancer. These antibodies can be subdivided according to their specificity, and each subset has different propensities for specific disorders.

=== Extractable nuclear antigens ===
Extractable nuclear antigens (ENA) are a group of autoantigens that were originally identified as antibody targets in people with autoimmune disorders. They are termed ENA because they can be extracted from the cell nucleus with saline. The ENAs consist of ribonucleoproteins and non-histone proteins, named by either the name of the donor who provided the prototype serum (Sm, Ro, La, Jo), or the name of the disease setting in which the antibodies were found (SS-A, SS-B, Scl-70).

==== Anti-Ro/SS-A and anti-La/SS-B ====
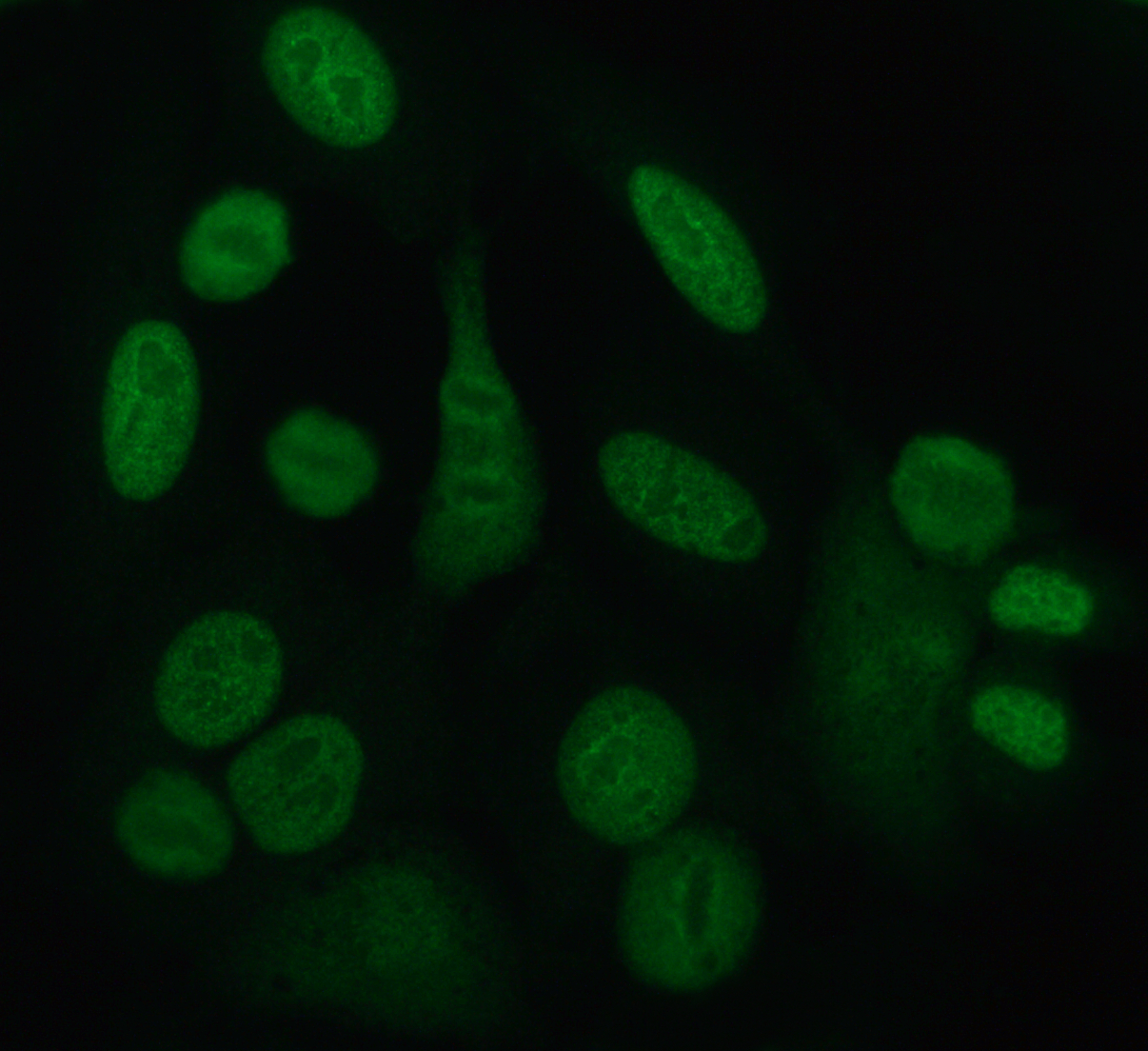
Speckled Immunofluorescence staining pattern of anti-nuclear antibodies on HEp-20-10 cells. This staining pattern is seen with anti-Ro and anti-La antibodies.

Anti-Ro and anti-La antibodies, also known as SS-A and SS-B, respectively, are commonly found in primary Sjögren's syndrome, an autoimmune disorder that affects the exocrine glands. The presence of both antibodies is found in 30–60% of Sjögren's syndrome, anti-Ro antibodies alone are found in 50–70% of Sjögren's syndrome and 30% of SLE with cutaneous involvement, and anti-La antibodies are rarely found in isolation. Anti-La antibodies are also found in SLE; however, Sjögren's syndrome is normally also present. Anti-Ro antibodies are also found less frequently in other disorders including autoimmune liver diseases, coeliac disease, autoimmune rheumatic diseases, cardiac neonatal lupus erythematosus and polymyositis. During pregnancy, anti-Ro antibodies can cross the placenta and cause heart block and neonatal lupus in babies. In Sjögren's syndrome, anti-Ro and anti-La antibodies correlate with early onset, increased disease duration, parotid gland enlargement, disease outside the glands and infiltration of glands by lymphocytes. Anti-Ro antibodies are specific to components of the Ro-RNP complex, comprising 45kDa, 52kDa, 54kDa and 60kDa proteins and RNA. The 60kDa DNA/RNA binding protein and 52kDa T-cell regulatory protein are the best characterised antigens of anti-Ro antibodies. Collectively, these proteins are part of a ribonucleoprotein (RNP) complex that associate with the human Y RNAs, hY1-hY5. The La antigen is a 48kDa transcription termination factor of RNA polymerase III, which associates with the Ro-RNP complex.

The mechanism of antibody production in Sjögren's syndrome is not fully understood, but apoptosis (programmed cell death) and molecular mimicry may play a role. The Ro and La antigens are expressed on the surface of cells undergoing apoptosis and may cause the inflammation within the salivary gland by interaction with cells of the immune system. The antibodies may also be produced through molecular mimicry, where cross reactive antibodies bind to both virus and human proteins. This may occur with one of the antigens, Ro or La, and may subsequently produce antibodies to other proteins through a process known as epitope spreading. The retroviral gag protein shows similarity to the La protein and is proposed as a possible example for molecular mimicry in Sjögren's syndrome.

==== Anti-Sm ====
Anti-Smith (Anti-Sm) antibodies are a very specific marker for SLE. Approximately 99% of individuals without SLE lack anti-Sm antibodies, but only 20% of people with SLE have the antibodies. They are associated with central nervous system involvement, kidney disease, lung fibrosis and pericarditis in SLE, but they are not associated with disease activity. The antigens of the anti-Sm antibodies are the core units of the small nuclear ribonucleoproteins (snRNPs), termed A to G, and will bind to the U1, U2, U4, U5 and U6 snRNPs. Most commonly, the antibodies are specific for the B, B' and D units. Molecular and epidemiological studies suggest that anti-Sm antibodies may be induced by molecular mimicry because the protein shows some similarity to Epstein-Barr virus proteins.

==== Anti-nRNP/anti-U1-RNP ====
Anti-nuclear ribonucleoprotein (anti-nRNP) antibodies, also known as anti-U1-RNP antibodies, are found in 30–40% of SLE. They are often found with anti-Sm antibodies, but they may be associated with different clinical associations. In addition to SLE, these antibodies are highly associated with mixed connective tissue disease. Anti-nRNP antibodies recognise the A and C core units of the snRNPs and because of this they primarily bind to the U1-snRNP. The immune response to RNP may be caused by the presentation of the nuclear components on the cell membrane in apoptotic blebs. Molecular mimicry has also been suggested as a possible mechanism for the production of antibodies to these proteins because of similarity between U1-RNP polypeptides and Epstein-Barr virus polypeptides.

==== Anti-Scl-70/anti-topoisomerase I ====
Anti-Scl-70 antibodies are linked to scleroderma. The sensitivity of the antibodies for scleroderma is approximately 34%, but is higher for cases with diffuse cutaneous involvement (40%), and lower for limited cutaneous involvement (10%). The specificity of the antibodies is 98% and 99.6% in other rheumatic diseases and normal individuals, respectively. In addition to scleroderma, these antibodies are found in approximately 5% of individuals with SLE. The antigenic target of anti-Scl-70 antibodies is topoisomerase I.

==== Anti-Jo-1 ====
Although anti-Jo-1 antibodies are often included with ANAs, they are actually antibodies to the cytoplasmic protein, Histidyl-tRNA synthetase – an aminoacyl-tRNA synthetase essential for the synthesis of histidine loaded tRNA. They are highly associated with polymyositis and dermatomyositis, and are rarely found in other connective tissue diseases. Around 20–40% of polymyositis is positive for Jo-1 antibodies and most will have interstitial lung disease, HLA-DR3 and HLA-DRw52 human leukocyte antigen (HLA) markers; collectively known as Jo-1 syndrome.

=== Anti-dsDNA ===
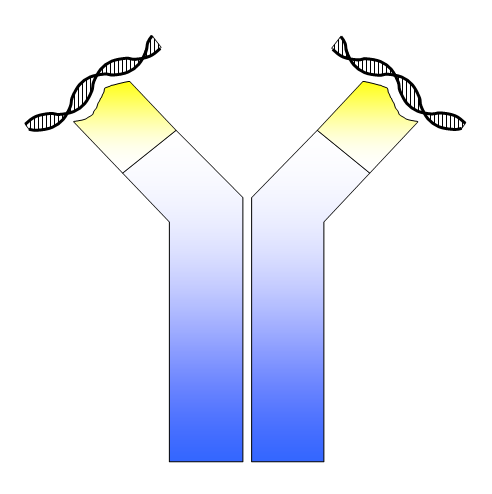
dsDNA antibody. The variable regions (yellow) are complementary to the dsDNA strands. These antibodies are found commonly in the sera of people with SLE.

Anti-double stranded DNA (anti-dsDNA) antibodies are highly associated with SLE. They are a very specific marker for the disease, with some studies quoting nearly 100%. Data on sensitivity ranges from 25 to 85%. Anti-dsDNA antibody levels, known as titres, correlate with disease activity in SLE; high levels indicate more active lupus. The presence of anti-dsDNA antibodies is also linked with lupus nephritis and there is evidence they are the cause. Some anti-dsDNA antibodies are cross reactive with other antigens found on the glomerular basement membrane (GBM) of the kidney, such as heparan sulphate, collagen IV, fibronectin and laminin. Binding to these antigens within the kidney could cause inflammation and complement fixation, resulting in kidney damage. Presence of high DNA-binding and low C3 levels have been shown to have extremely high predictive value (94%) for the diagnosis of SLE. It is also possible that the anti-dsDNA antibodies are internalised by cells when they bind membrane antigens and then are displayed on the cell surface. This could promote inflammatory responses by T-cells within the kidney. Not all anti-dsDNA antibodies are associated with lupus nephritis and that other factors can cause this symptom in their absence. The antigen of anti-dsDNA antibodies is double stranded DNA.

=== Anti-histone antibodies ===
Anti-histone antibodies are found in the serum of up to 75–95% of people with drug-induced lupus and 75% of idiopathic SLE. Unlike anti-dsDNA antibodies in SLE, these antibodies do not fix complement. Although they are most commonly found in drug induced lupus, they are also found in some cases of SLE, scleroderma, rheumatoid arthritis and undifferentiated connective tissue disease. Many drugs are known to cause drug induced lupus and they produce various antigenic targets within the nucleosome that are often cross reactive with several histone proteins and DNA. Procainamide causes a form of drug-induced lupus that produces antibodies to the histone H2A and H2B complex.

=== Anti-gp210 and anti-p62 ===
Both anti-glycoprotein-210 (anti-gp210) and anti-nucleoporin 62 (anti-p62) antibodies are antibodies to components of the nuclear membrane and are found in primary biliary cirrhosis (PBC). Each antibody is present in approximately 25–30% of PBC. The antigens of both antibodies are constituents of the nuclear membrane. gp210 is a 200kDa protein involved in anchoring components of the nuclear pore to the nuclear membrane. The p62 antigen is a 60kDa nuclear pore complex.

=== Anti-centromere antibodies ===
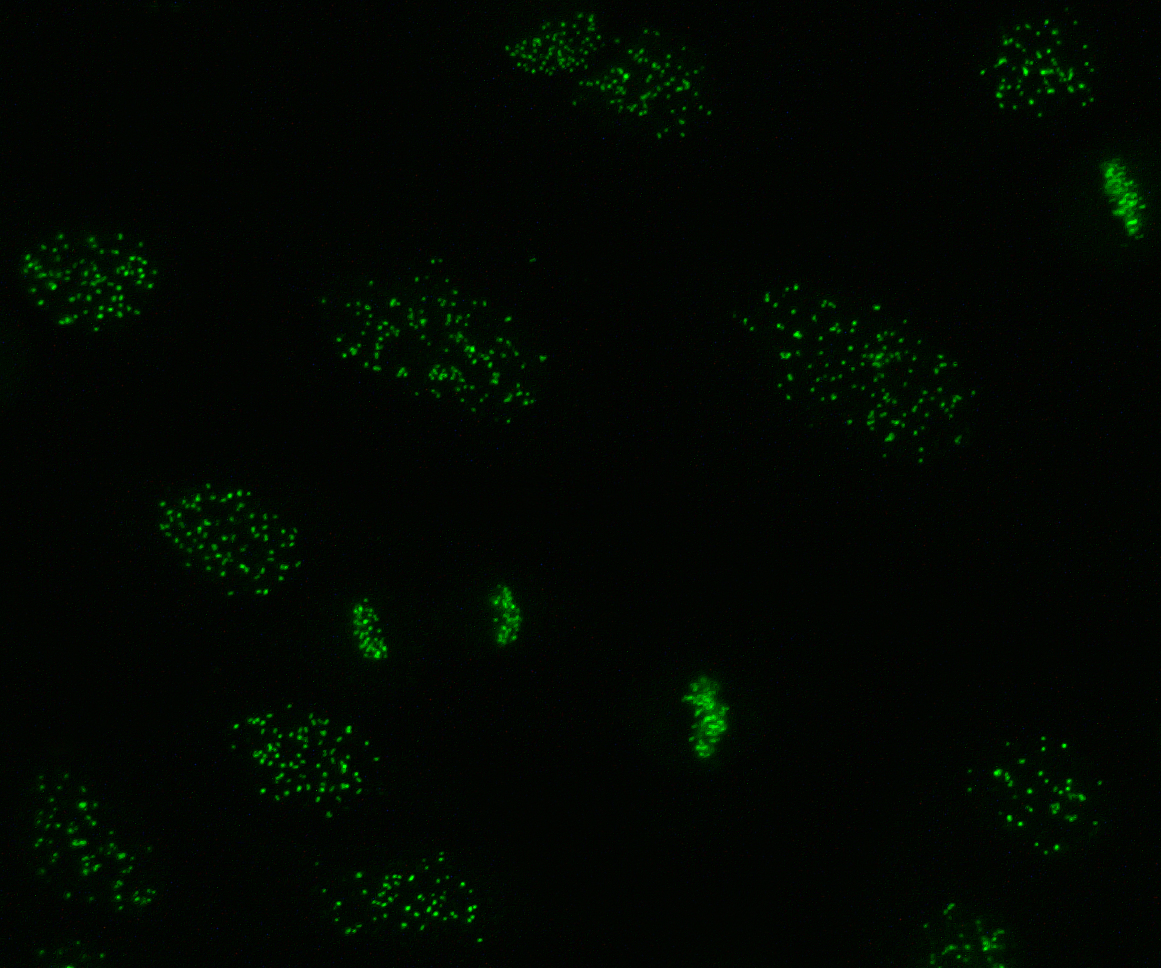
Immunofluorescence staining pattern of anti-centromere antibodies on HEp-20-10 cells

Anti-centromere antibodies are associated with limited cutaneous systemic sclerosis, also known as CREST syndrome, primary biliary cirrhosis and proximal scleroderma. There are six known antigens, which are all associated with the centromere; CENP-A to CENP-F. CENP-A is a 17kDa histone H3-like protein. CENP-B is an 80kDa DNA binding protein involved in the folding of heterochromatin. CENP-C is a 140kDa protein involved in kinetochore assembly. CENP-D is a 50kDa protein of unknown function, but may be homologous to another protein involved in chromatin condensation, RCC1. CENP-E is a 312kDa protein from the kinesin motor protein family. CENP-F is a 367kDa protein from the nuclear matrix that associates with the kinetochore in late G2 phase during mitosis. CENP-A, B and C antibodies are most commonly found (16–42% of systemic sclerosis) and are associated with Raynaud's phenomenon, telangiectasias, lung involvement and early onset in systemic sclerosis.

Anti-centromere antibodies are found in approximately 60% of patients with limited systemic scleroderma and in 15% of those with the diffuse form of scleroderma. The specificity of this test is >98%. Thus, a positive anti-centromere antibody finding is strongly suggestive of limited systemic scleroderma. Anti-centromere antibodies present early in the course of disease and are notably predictive of limited cutaneous involvement and a decreased likelihood of aggressive internal organ involvement, such as fibrosis in the lungs.

When present in primary biliary cirrhosis, ACAs are prognostic of portal hypertension such that serum ACA levels correlate with the severity of portal hypertension.

=== Anti-sp100 ===
Anti-sp100 antibodies are found in approximately 20–30% of primary biliary cirrhosis (PBC). They are found in few individuals without PBC, and therefore are a very specific marker of the disease. The sp100 antigen is found within nuclear bodies; large protein complexes in the nucleus that may have a role in cell growth and differentiation.

=== Anti-PM-Scl ===
Anti-PM-Scl antibodies are found in up to 50% of polymyositis/systemic sclerosis (PM/SSc) overlap syndrome. Around 80% of individuals with antibodies present in their blood serum will have the disorder. The presence of the antibodies is linked to limited cutaneous involvement of PM/SSc overlap syndrome. The antigenic targets of the antibodies are components of the RNA-processing exosome complex in the nucleolus. There are ten proteins in this complex and antibodies to eight of them are found at varying frequencies; PM/Scl-100 (70–80%), PM/Scl-75 (46–80%), hRrp4 (50%), hRrp42 (21%), hRrp46 (18%), hCs14 (14%), hRrp41 (10%) and hRrp40 (7%).

=== Anti-DFS70 antibodies ===
Anti-DFS70 antibodies generate a dense fine speckled pattern in indirect immunofluorescence and are found in normals and in various conditions, but are not associated with a systemic autoimmune pathology. Therefore, they can be used to help to rule out such conditions in ANA positive individuals. A significant number of patients are diagnosed as systemic lupus erythematosus or undifferentiated connective tissue disease largely based on a positive ANA. In case no defined autoantibody can be detected (e.g. anti-ENA antibodies), the testing of anti-DFS70 antibodies is recommended to verify the diagnosis. Anti-DFS70 antibody tests are available as CE-marked tests. Until now, no FDA cleared assay is available.

== ANA test ==
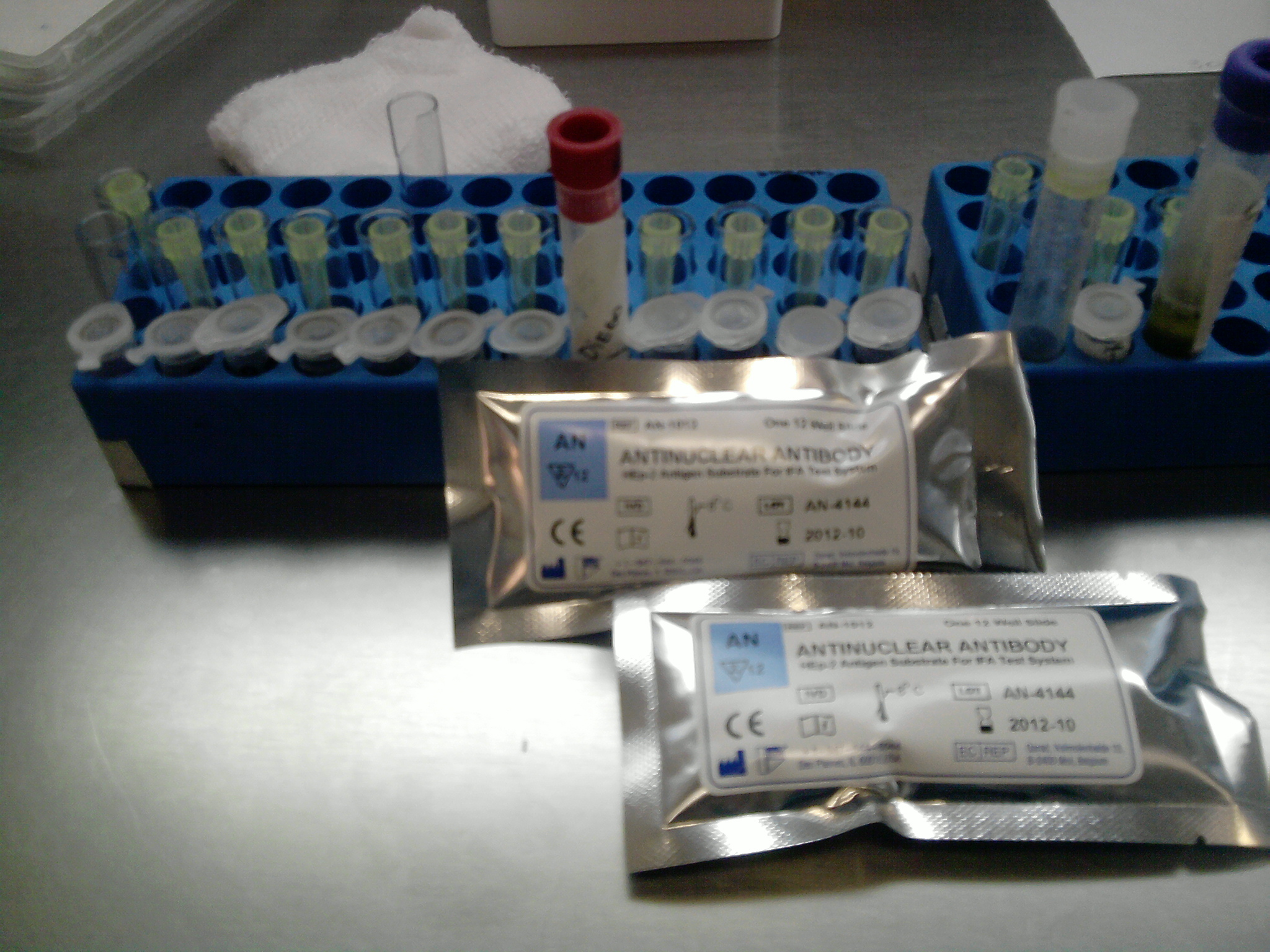
Kit for carrying out a test for antinuclear antibodies

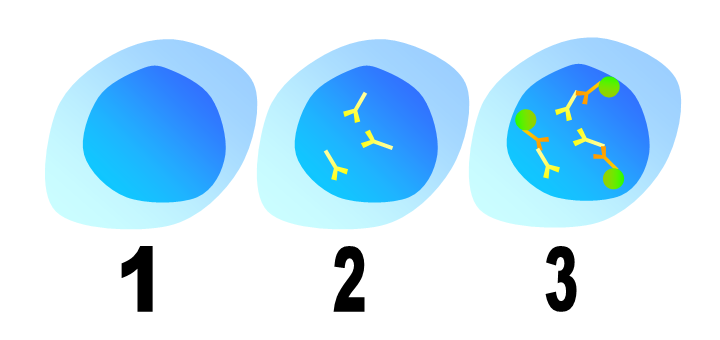
Stages of immunofluorescence for the detection of antinuclear antibodies. HEp-2 cells are permeablised (1) and then incubated with a person's blood serum (2). If the serum contains antibodies, they will bind to antigens within the HEp-2 cell nucleus. These antibodies can be visualised by subsequent incubation with anti-human antibodies conjugated to a fluorescent molecule (3).

The presence of ANAs in blood can be confirmed by a screening test. Although there are many tests for the detection of ANAs, the most common tests used for screening are indirect immunofluorescence and enzyme-linked immunosorbent assay (ELISA). Following detection of ANAs, various subtypes are determined.

=== Indirect immunofluorescence ===
Indirect immunofluorescence is one of the most commonly used tests for ANAs. Typically, HEp-2 cells are used as a substrate to detect the antibodies in human serum. Microscope slides are coated with HEp-2 cells and the serum is incubated with the cells. If the said and targeted antibodies are present then they will bind to the antigens on the cells; in the case of ANAs, the antibodies will bind to the nucleus. These can be visualised by adding a fluorescent tagged (usually FITC or rhodopsin B) anti-human antibody that binds to the antibodies. The molecule will fluoresce when a specific wavelength of light shines on it, which can be seen under the microscope. Depending on the antibody present in the human serum and the localisation of the antigen in the cell, distinct patterns of fluorescence will be seen on the HEp-2 cells. Levels of antibodies are analysed by performing dilutions on blood serum. An ANA test is considered positive if fluorescence is seen at a titre of 1:40/1:80. Higher titres are more clinically significant as low positives (≤1:160) are found in up to 20% of healthy individuals, especially the elderly. Only around 5% of the healthy population have ANA titres of 1:160 or higher.

==== HEp-2 ====
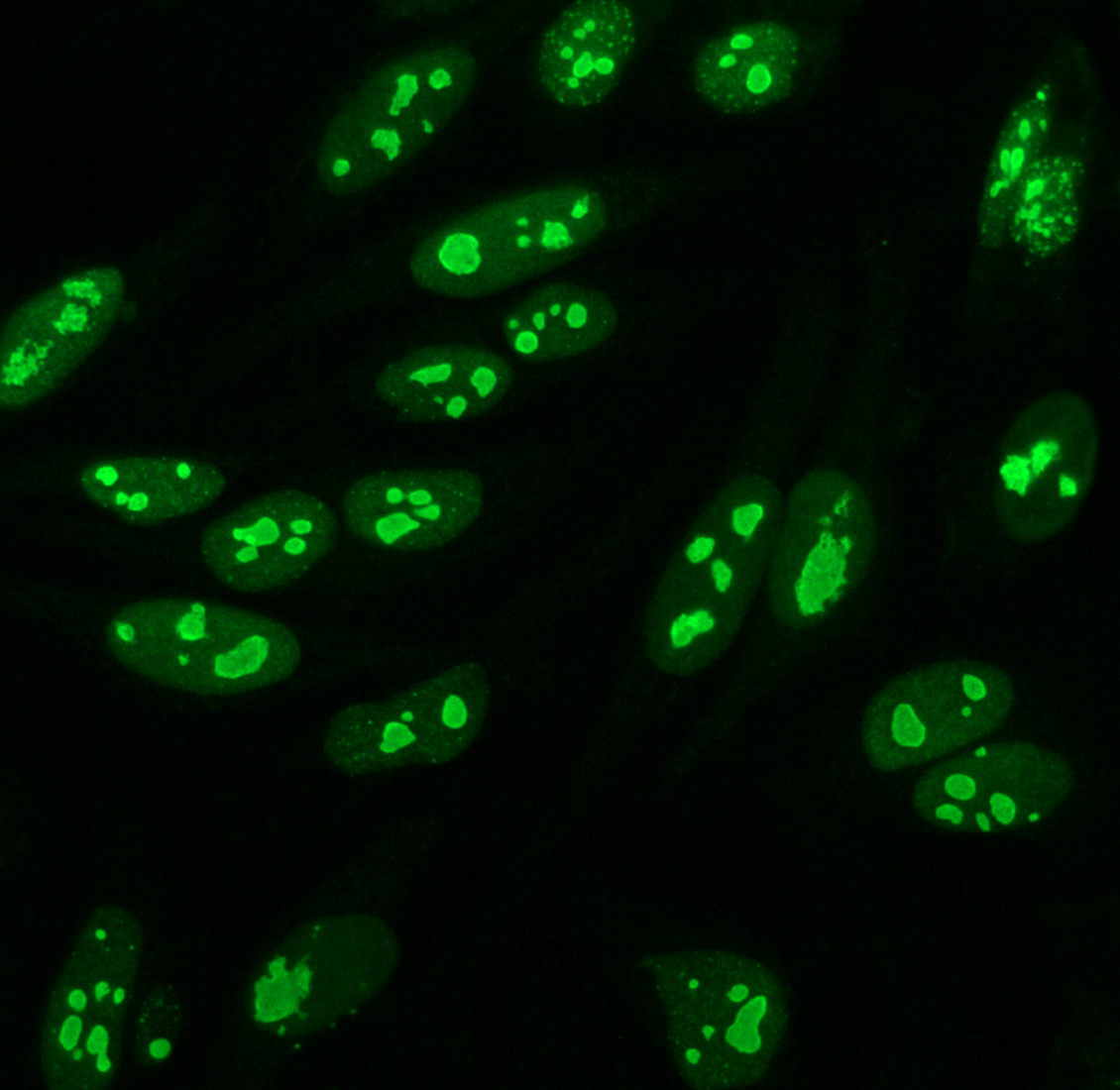
Nucleolar staining pattern of ANAs

Until around 1975, when HEp-2 cells were introduced, animal tissue was used as the standard substrate for immunofluorescence. HEp-2 cells are currently one of the most common substrates for ANA detection by immunofluorescence.

Originally started a laryngeal carcinoma strain, the cell line was contaminated and displaced by HeLa cells, and has now been identified as actually HeLa cells.

They are superior to the previously used animal tissues because of their large size and the high rate of mitosis (cell division) in the cell line. This allows the detection of antibodies to mitosis-specific antigens, such as centromere antibodies. They also allow identification of anti-Ro antibodies, because acetone is used for fixation of the cells (other fixatives can wash the antigen away).

There are many nuclear staining patterns seen on HEp-2 cells: homogeneous, speckled, nucleolar, nuclear membranous, centromeric, nuclear dot and pleomorphic. The homogeneous pattern is seen when the condensed chromosomes and interphase chromatin stain. This pattern is associated with anti-dsDNA antibodies, antibodies to nucleosomal components, and anti-histone antibodies. There are two speckled patterns: fine and coarse. The fine speckled pattern has fine nuclear staining with unstained metaphase chromatin, which is associated with anti-Ro and anti-La antibodies. The coarse staining pattern has coarse granular nuclear staining, caused by anti-U1-RNP and anti-Sm antibodies. The nucleolar staining pattern is associated with many antibodies including anti-Scl-70, anti-PM-Scl, anti-fibrillarin and anti-Th/To. Nuclear membrane staining appears as a fluorescent ring around the cell nucleus and are produced by anti-gp210 and anti-p62 antibodies. The centromere pattern shows multiple nuclear dots in interphase and mitotic cells, corresponding to the number of chromosomes in the cell. Nuclear dot patterns show between 13 and 25 nuclear dots in interphase cells and are produced by anti-sp100 antibodies. Pleomorphic pattern is caused by antibodies to the proliferating cell nuclear antigen. Indirect immunofluorescence has been shown to be slightly superior compared to ELISA in detection of ANA from HEp-2 cells.

==== Crithidia luciliae ====
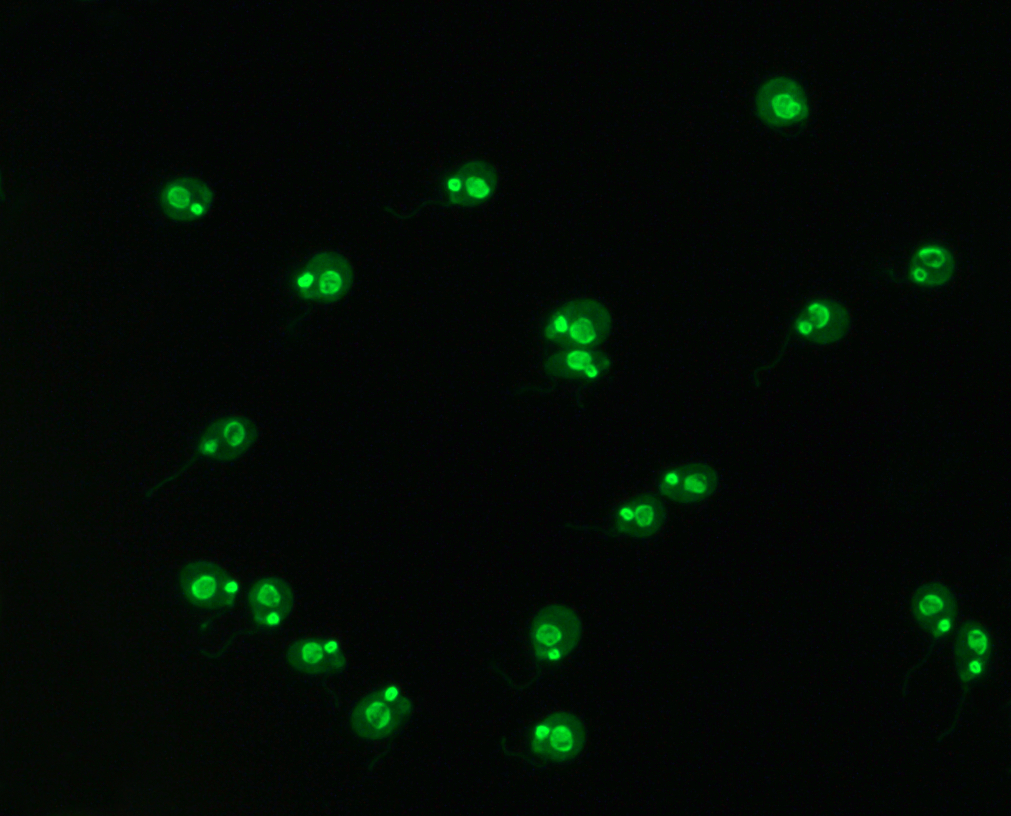
Immunofluorescence staining pattern of anti-dsDNA antibodies on C. luciliaesubstrate. The kinetoplast located near the flagellum is stained, indicating the presence of anti-dsDNA antibodies in a person with systemic lupus erythamatosus.

Crithidia luciliae are haemoflaggelate single celled protists. They are used as a substrate in immunofluorescence for the detection of anti-dsDNA antibodies. They possess an organelle known as the kinetoplast which is a large mitochondrion with a network of interlocking circular dsDNA molecules. After incubation with serum containing anti-dsDNA antibodies and fluorescent-labelled anti-human antibodies, the kinetoplast will fluoresce. The lack of other nuclear antigens in this organelle means that using C. luciliae as a substrate allows for the specific detection of anti-dsDNA antibodies.

=== ELISA ===
Enzyme-linked immunosorbent assay (ELISA) uses antigen-coated microtitre plates for the detection of ANAs. Each well of a microtitre plate is coated with either a single antigen or multiple antigens to detect specific antibodies or to screen for ANAs, respectively. The antigens are either from cell extracts or recombinant. Blood serum is incubated in the wells of the plate and is washed out. If antibodies that bind to antigen are present then they will remain after washing. A secondary anti-human antibody conjugated to an enzyme such as horseradish peroxidase is added. The enzyme reaction will produce a change in colour of the solution that is proportional to the amount of antibody bound to the antigen. There are significant differences in the detection of ANA by immunofluorescence and different ELISA kits and there is only a marginal agreement between these. A clinician must be familiar with the differences in order to evaluate the outcomes of the various assays.

=== Sensitivity ===
The following table lists the sensitivity of different types of ANAs for different diseases.

ANA type	Target antigen	Sensitivity (%)						
ANA type	Target antigen	SLE	Drug-induced LE	Diffuse systemic sclerosis	Limited systemic scleroderma	Sjögren syndrome	Inflammatory myopathy	MCTD
All ANAs (by indirect IF)	Various	95	100	80	80	70	40–60	95
Anti-dsDNA	DNA	60	–	–	–	30	–	-
Anti-Sm	Core proteins of snRNPs	40	–	–	–	–	–	-
Anti-histone	Histones	60	90	–	–	–	–	-
Anti Scl-70	Type I topoisomerase	–	–	20	10	–	–	-
Anti-centromere	Centromeric proteins	–	–	30	80	–	–	-
SS-A (Ro)	RNPs	40	–	–	–	50	10	-
SS-B (La)	RNPs	10–15	–	–	–	60–90	–	
– = less than 5% sensitivity

Some ANAs appear in several types of disease, resulting in lower specificity of the test. For example, IgM-rheumatoid factor (IgM-RF) have been shown to cross-react with ANA giving falsely positive immunofluorescence. Positive ANA as well as anti-DNA antibodies have been reported in patients with autoimmune thyroid disease. ANA can have a positive test result in up to 45% of people with autoimmune thyroid conditions or rheumatoid arthritis and up to 15% of people with HIV or hepatitis C. As per Lupus Foundation of America, "about 5% of the general population will have a positive ANA. However, at least 95% of the people who have a positive ANA do not have lupus. A positive ANA test can sometimes run in families, even if family members have no evidence of lupus." On the other hand, they say, although 95% of the patients who actually have lupus test positive for ANA, "Only a small percentage have a negative ANA, and many of those have other antibodies (such as anti-phospholipid antibodies, anti-Ro, anti-SSA) or their ANA converted from positive to negative from steroids, cytotoxic medications, or uremia (kidney failure)."

== History ==
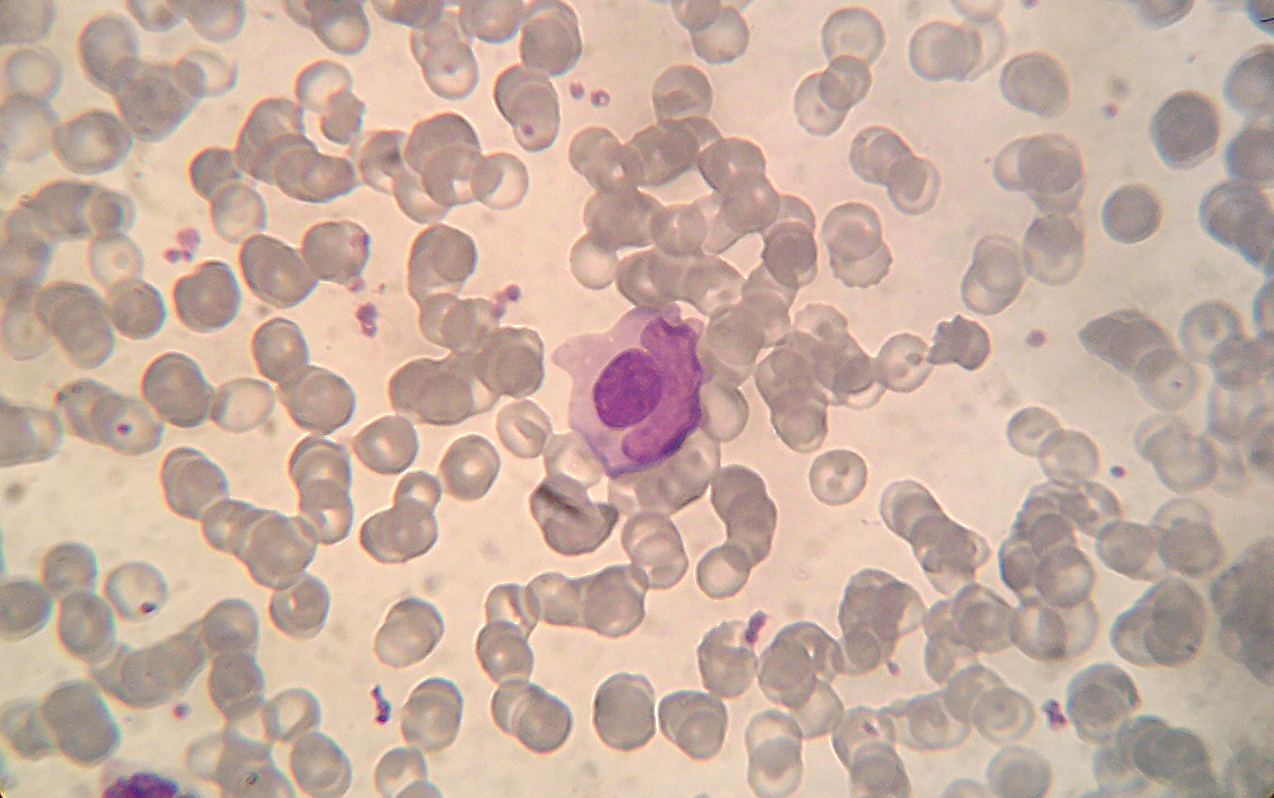
LE cell

The LE cell was discovered in bone marrow in 1948 by Hargraves et al. In 1957 Holborow et al. first demonstrated ANA using indirect immunofluorescence. This was the first indication that processes affecting the cell nucleus were responsible for SLE. In 1959 it was discovered that serum from individuals with SLE contained antibodies that precipitated with saline extracts of nuclei, known as extractable nuclear antigens (ENAs). This led to the characterisation of ENA antigens and their respective antibodies. Thus, anti-Sm and anti-RNP antibodies were discovered in 1966 and 1971, respectively. In the 1970s, the anti-Ro/anti-SS-A and anti-La/anti-SS-B antibodies were discovered. The Scl-70 antibody was known to be a specific antibody to scleroderma in 1979, however the antigen (topoisomerase-I) was not characterised until 1986. The Jo-1 antigen and antibody were characterised in 1980.

== See also ==
- Anti-neutrophil cytoplasmic antibody (ANCA)
- Rheumatoid factor
