= Extractable nuclear antigen =

Extractable nuclear antigens (ENAs) are over 100 different soluble cytoplasmic and nuclear antigens. They are known as "extractable" because they can be removed from cell nuclei using saline and represent six main proteins: Ro, La, Sm, RNP, Scl-70, Jo1. Most ENAs are part of spliceosomes or nucleosomes complexes and are a type of small nuclear ribonucleoprotein (snRNPS). The location in the nucleus and association with spliceosomes or nucleosomes results in these ENAs being associated with additional RNA and proteins such as polymerases. This quality of ENAs often makes it difficult to purify and quantify their presence for clinical use.

== Clinical applications ==
An extractable nuclear antigen panel, or an ENA panel, tests for presence of autoantibodies in the blood that react with proteins in the cell nucleus. It is usually done as a follow-up to a positive antinuclear antibody (ANA) test and when one is showing symptoms of an autoimmune disorder. The ANA tests for the presence or absence of autoantibodies, while the ENA panel evaluates which proteins in the cell nucleus the autoantibodies recognize. The ENA panel helps diagnosis, distinguish between, and monitor the progression of autoimmune diseases and is performed with a simple blood draw. While the levels of autoantibodies may fluctuate through one's life, once one develops autoantibodies, one will always have them. Autoantibodies to these antigens are associated with particular connective tissue disorders. Indeed, in 84.3% of positive anti-ENA samples, ANA reagents were also found. The use of anti-ENA autoantibody tests can serve as additional verification of an autoimmune disorder, because a positive ANA test alone does not suffice for diagnosis. In fact, low levels of ANAs can be found in healthy patients. The applications of anti-ENA testing varies from excluding patient groups from specific groups, connective tissue diseases, and to monitor disease activity. In essence, it allows clinicians to exclude specific autoimmune disorders if a particular autoantibody is not present, and allows clinicians to track progression of a disease if the levels of these autoantibodies increase or decrease. To confirm the presence of anti-ENAs, it is currently recommended to use two or more methods to confirm anti-ENAs to avoid false positives. The diagnosis of autoimmune connective tissue diseases (CTDs) is done through analysis of clinical symptoms and signs, but also through the identification of the autoantibodies directed against nuclear antigens. A 2002 paper also seeks to compare the diagnostic tests used in immunology laboratories to measure anti-ENAs and ways to improve this testing and reporting. Double immunodiffusion (DID) and counterimmunoelectrophoresis (CIEP), two forms of gel-based techniques, are used to gain information on the clinical significance and the role of these antibodies in those with CTDs.

== Techniques ==
=== Gel-based ===
Since the discovery of ENAs, they have been used as a diagnostic tool in connective tissue disease. Two widely used gel-based techniques were used to identify anti-ENAs and their associations to disease in early work, double immunodiffusion (DID) and counterimmunoelectrophoresis (CIEP). Both of these techniques require the precipitation of antigens for valid results. Depending on the anti-ENA being investigated, one technique may be used over the other. For example, Scl-70 antigen is less negatively charged, which can result in the antigen traveling in the same direction as the antibody. This would result in the antibody-antigen complex not precipitating; leading to invalid results. In addition, some anti-SS-B antibodies commonly identified in Sjögren syndrome may not be detected with this method. However, this method is economically feasible and specific to confirm a diagnosis. There are two sensitivities to note when viewing data from these gel-based techniques, assay sensitivity and disease sensitivity. Assay sensitivity is the ability to recognize when an antibody is present, while disease sensitivity is the ability to recognize the frequency in which the antibody occurs in a disease. Due to limitations of gel-based techniques in disease sensitivity, other techniques have been explored in order to increase assay sensitivity without decreasing disease sensitivity. For example, in patients with Systemic lupus erythematous (SLE), only 8–40% have detectable anti-SM when using gel-based assays. CIEP has been shown to be more sensitive than DID.

=== Hemagglutination, ELISA, Western Blot ===
Three additional techniques, passive hemagglutination, enzyme linked immunosorbent assay (ELISA), and western blotting (WB), can be used in order to identify ENAs and link them to specific diseases. Passive hemagglutination was popular in the late 1970s, but very few studies have been done using them and was restricted to anti-Sm and anti-ribonuclear protein (RNP) antibodies. Enzyme linked immunosorbent assay (ELISA) has become the most widely used technique for testing for anti-ENAs due to them being simple to perform, quantitative, and high volume output. While this method has increased assay sensitivity and is efficient for high volume labs, they have a much lower disease specificity than alternative techniques. This is due to the inability to properly isolate the ENAs without large costs due to their association with complexes in the nucleus of the cell. Another worry with the ELISA technique is that anti-Sm antibodies have been reported in patients without SLE which would lead to over-investigating, but could be due to the quality of the antigen source used. Western blotting has a major disadvantage in that antibodies targeted against conformational epitopes can not be detected. On top of that, false positive can occur and the disease specificity is lower than other techniques. While each technique has their advantages and disadvantages, ELISA has the least severe disadvantages of potential for false positives (which are less dangerous than false negatives) and expensive.

Many labs use a combination of both of these techniques to improve efficiency without sacrificing specificity. The current recommendation by European Consensus workshops is to screen for positive anti-ENAs with the ELISA technique. A more specific test such as CIEP will follow with samples that are identified as positive.

The six main antigens used in immunological laboratories for detection are Ro, La, Sm, RNP, Scl-70 and Jo1, which are screened for by Ouchterlony double immuno diffusion techniques and confirmed by immunoblotting. On anti-nuclear antibody tests, these antigens have a speckled pattern.

== Terminology ==
ENAs originally referred to proteins found in a saline extract of cell nuclei. Components have since been more clearly identified and in fact include many cytoplasmic molecules. The misnomer, however, has remained. These proteins are intimately associated with various RNA molecules and are thus called ribonucleoproteins, but the nomenclature used for them is often a source of confusion, Sm, Ro and La were named after the first 2 letters of the surnames of the patients in whom they were first found. Two proteins associated with Sjögren syndrome were independently described as antigens A and B, but are now known to be identical to Ro and La respectively, i.e. SS-A = Ro and SS-B = La.

ENA (extractable nuclear antigen) panel tests, test for autoantibodies to proteins in the cell nucleus. The term "extractable" is derived from the ability to remove the antigens from the nuclei with saline and common proteins. The method of identifying these specimens is why they are also referred to as antibodies to saline-extracted antigens.

== ENA ==
Anti-ENA is a grouping of antibodies often used to screen for mixed connective tissue disease (MCTD), Sjögren's syndrome and systemic lupus erythematosus and commonly is composed of six tests:

- anti-Sm (for SLE)
- anti-RNP (for MCTD)
- anti-La/anti-SS-B (for Sjögren's)
- anti-Ro/anti-SS-A(for Sjögren's)
- anti-Scl70 (for Scleroderma)
- anti-Jo (for Dermatomyositis)

Sensitivity and specificity of these tests depends on the type of assay employed, and will therefore vary by lab. The following table illustrates the sensitivity and specificity of ENA antibodies at detecting SLE with the ELISA technique.

Antibody (tested using ELISA)	Sensitivity (%) for SLE	Specificity (%) for SLE
Anti-Ro (SS-A)	61	80–93
Anti-La (SS-B)	27–35	88–97
Anti-Sm	34–45	88–100
Anti-RNP	39–64	84–97
Reference for all values:

In addition, the use of ENA testing has also been used for the study of wheat related disorders such as celiac disease. A study conducted in 2018 screened patients with wheat related disorders for 10 anti-ENA antibodies.

- SSA (Ro)
- SSB (La)
- RNP/Sm
- Jo-1
- Sm
- Scl-70
- Chromatin
- Centromere
- Histone
- RNA polymerase III

73% of celiac disease subjects tested positive for anti-histone and was the most prevalent, which is typically associated with drug-induced lupus erythematosus. This implicates a high probability of an autoimmune disorder in patients with wheat-related disorders.
