= Mixed connective tissue disease =

- Other names: MCTD, connective tissue disease overlap syndrome, mixed collagen vascular disease, sharp syndrome.
- Specialty: Immunology, rheumatology
- Frequency: 0.005%

Mixed connective tissue disease (MCTD) is a systemic autoimmune disease that shares characteristics with at least two other systemic autoimmune diseases, including systemic sclerosis (Ssc), systemic lupus erythematosus (SLE), polymyositis/dermatomyositis (PM/DM), and rheumatoid arthritis. The idea behind the "mixed" disease is that this specific autoantibody is also present in other autoimmune diseases such as systemic lupus erythematosus, polymyositis, scleroderma, etc. MCTD was characterized as an individual disease in 1972 by Sharp et al., and the term was introduced by Leroy in 1980.

Some experts consider MCTD to be the same as undifferentiated connective tissue disease, but other experts specifically reject this idea because undifferentiated connective tissue disease is not necessarily associated with serum antibodies directed against the U1-RNP. Furthermore, MCTD is associated with a more clearly defined set of signs and symptoms.

== Signs and symptoms ==
The early clinical features of MCTD are nonspecific and may include fatigue, low-grade fever, myalgias, Raynaud phenomenon, swelling of the fingers or hands, arthralgia, esophageal reflux or dysmotility, acrosclerosis (also known as sclerodactyly), mild myositis, and various forms of pulmonary involvement. MCTD can affect nearly any organ system.

=== Skin involvement ===
Skin involvement is common in most people with MCTD and is frequently a presenting characteristic. The most prevalent skin change is Raynaud's phenomenon, which usually appears early in the course of the disease. Swollen digits are a common sign, and on occasion, the complete hand swells. Acrosclerosis, also known as sclerodactyly, can develop with or without proximal scleroderma and is usually a later symptom of the condition.

Rashes are found in 50–60% of patients. Common symptoms include photosensitivity and malar rashes, similar to those seen with SLE. Discoid lesions are also occasionally seen. Some patients with MCTD may have scleroderma-like symptoms such as squared telangiectasia on the hands and face, periungual telangiectasia, sclerodactyly, and calcinosis cutis.

Like systemic sclerosis, aberrant nailfold capillaroscopy with enormous capillaries, atypical forms, and low capillary density is a common hallmark of MCTD, and this can accumulate over time.

=== Joint involvement ===
Approximately 60% of MCTD patients develop visible arthritis, frequently with rheumatoid arthritis (RA) deformities such as boutonniere deformities and swan neck alterations. Other features include tiny marginal erosions and destructive arthritis, such as arthritis mutilans.

=== Pulmonary involvement ===
The lungs are commonly affected in MCTD, with around 75% of patients having lung involvement. The most prevalent pulmonary complications of MCTD are interstitial lung disease (ILD) and pulmonary hypertension; however, a wide spectrum of other pulmonary problems have been recorded, including pleural effusions, pleuritic discomfort, alveolar hemorrhage, and thromboembolic illness. Early indications of pulmonary involvement include dyspnea, dry cough, and pleuritic chest pain.

=== Muscle involvement ===
Diagnosing MCTD involves identification of inflammatory myopathy that is histologically and clinically identical to polymyositis (PM). The majority of persons with MCTD do not experience clinical weakness. People with MCTD typically have mild myositis, with normal muscle enzymes and electromyographic results. Some people may be completely asymptomatic. Myositis can be severe and difficult to differentiate from conventional dermatomyositis. Myalgia is a prevalent complaint among patients with MCTD.

=== Cardiac involvement ===
About 30% of MCTD patients have symptomatic heart disease, whereas up to 40% have subclinical cardiac illness. The most common ECG abnormalities are hemiblock, bundle branch block, and atrioventricular block. Pericarditis is the most common clinical indication of cardiac involvement, affecting up to 40% of patients.

=== Kidney involvement ===
Renal involvement is a key complication of MCTD. Some studies show that it affects around 25% of people and is generally asymptomatic. The most prevalent finding is membranous nephropathy; however, nephrotic range proteinuria may also occur. Tubulointerstitial nephritis, mesangioproliferative glomerulonephritis, and hypertensive episodes resembling scleroderma renal crisis have also been observed.

=== Gastrointestinal involvement ===
Gastrointestinal involvement is prevalent and overlaps with systemic sclerosis. Esophageal dysfunction is the most common gastrointestinal manifestation. The condition is initially asymptomatic, with difficulty swallowing (dysphagia) being the most prevalent symptom.

=== Nervous system involvement ===
The original clinical criteria of MCTD stressed the absence of central nervous system (CNS) involvement. For instance, people with MCTD do not suffer serious problems such as cerebritis, psychosis, or seizures. However, roughly 25% of individuals have some form of CNS illness. The most common central nervous system manifestation is trigeminal (fifth cranial) nerve neuropathy, which may be a patient’s first symptom. Headaches are prevalent and are typically vascular in origin. Headaches can also be due to aseptic meningitis. Sensorineural hearing loss is frequently overlooked; however, it is estimated to occur in 50% of MCTD patients.

=== Hematologic involvement ===
Hematologic abnormalities are prevalent in MCTD. Mild lymphadenopathy affects 25–50% of patients, and it is frequently an early symptom of the disease. This usually subsides over time; however, it may reappear during flares. Between 50% and 75% of people with MCTD will experience anemia, lymphopenia, or leukopenia. Anemia of chronic disease is the most common type of anemia seen in MCTD. Thrombocytopenia can develop in MCTD but is less common than leukopenia or anemia.

=== Systemic involvement ===
Malaise and low-grade fever may develop with MCTD. The condition can cause elevated body temperatures without a clear cause. Sicca symptoms are frequent in MCTD, affecting 25-50% of individuals.

== Causes ==
Genetic and environmental factors both influence susceptibility to MCTD. The condition is associated with aberrant immunological regulation and immune-effector pathways.

=== Triggers ===
Several environmental factors have been postulated to modify illness susceptibility or induce disease; the most persuasive of these is the role of female sex hormones, as evidenced by the disease's significant female-to-male ratio and other data. Furthermore, investigations indicate that Epstein–Barr virus, retroviruses, or other viruses may play a role in causing disease in some patients. Cytomegalovirus has also been proposed as capable of eliciting anti-RNP antibody responses in the absence of illness. Environmental exposure to vinyl chloride has been linked to the development of an MCTD-like condition.

=== Genetics ===
In MCTD, major histocompatibility complex (MHC) and non-MHC genes have been linked to disease vulnerability. HLA-DR4 in the MHC is linked to both anti-RNP antibody responses and MCTD. The HLA class II phenotype/genotype most closely connected with scleroderma, HLA-DR5, and its subgroups, has been demonstrated to have a negative connection with MCTD.

Another genetic feature of MCTD is the presence of anti-RNP antibodies. However, these antibodies are not present in all patients. Genome-wide association studies have revealed that there are parts of a patient’s genetic material that cause production of these anti-RNP antibodies. The mechanism is not yet thoroughly defined.

== Mechanism ==
Several immunological variables have been linked to MCTD and may play a role in disease etiology. The 70-kD peptide of the U1-RNP antigen appears to be a dominant autoantigen in MCTD, consisting of a 437 residue polypeptide that noncovalently binds with U1-RNA via an RNA binding region on the polypeptide spanning residues 92-202. The U1 70-kD polypeptide and RNP undergo a range of potential and demonstrated structural alterations, each of which may influence the antigenicity of the RNP complex.

Autoantibodies are generally recognized as a feature of several rheumatic illnesses, including MCTD. Two investigations have provided evidence that anti-RNP antibodies have a role in the development of MCTD by linking antibody emergence to clinical illness. Beyond antibody formation, B cells can serve in a variety of other important immunological pathways, including as antigen presentation, pathogenic cytokine secretion, and tissue harm via antibody-directed mechanisms.

T cells appear to have a key role in the pathophysiology of MCTD. RNP-reactive CD4+ T cells have been detected in the peripheral blood of MCTD patients. Both anti-RNP and anti-U1-RNA antibodies identified in patients' serum have typically undergone isotope shift to immunoglobulin G (IgG) subtypes. In addition, there is intense lymphocyte infiltration, with many T cells detected in the locations of tissue injury at autopsy and in patient biopsy specimens. In vitro studies have also revealed that human RNP reactive T cells can aid in the generation of anti-RNP autoantibodies.

Vascular changes cause some of the most severe clinical signs of MCTD. Adult MCTD patients had uncontrolled overexpression of endostatin and vascular endothelial growth factor (VEGF), two angiostatic and angiogenic factors. VEGF levels were higher in MCTD individuals who had pulmonary arterial hypertension and myositis, which may indicate a more severe course of disease.

== Diagnosis ==
Because of the vast range of clinical symptoms in MCTD, diagnosis is not often straightforward. Different types of connective tissue disease, such as transitory illnesses and the early stages of characterized connective tissue diseases that will become completely defined in a few months or years, should be considered in the differential diagnosis. There are also uncompleted versions of recognized connective tissue diseases, in which clinical and serological symptoms allow for a diagnosis but classification criteria are not met. The most prevalent strategy to diagnosis in clinical practice combines serological criteria with at least three clinical criteria.

=== Classification ===
Four commonly accepted criteria for classifying patients with MCTD have been published: the Sharp criteria (1987), the Alarcón-Segovia criteria (1987), the Kasukawa criteria (1987), and the Kahn criteria (1991). The Alarcon-Segovia and Kahn criteria have equivalent sensitivity and specificity, and a comparison of the four diagnostic criteria suggests that the Kasukawa criteria provide the best sensitivity, while both Alarcon-Segovia and Kahn criteria have the maximum specificity.

==== Sharp criteria ====
The Sharp criteria require at least four major criteria, as well as anti-U1-RNP antibody titer of at least 1:4000, or two major criteria from criteria 1, 2, and 3, and two minor criteria, plus anti-U1-RNP antibody titer of at least 1:1000. The Sharp criteria also excludes anyone with a positive anti-Sm antibody. It has a sensitivity of 42% and a specificity of 87.7%.

Major criteria:

1. Myositis
2. Pulmonary involvement:
  - Diffusion capacity < 70% of normal values
  - Pulmonary hypertension
  - Proliferative vascular lesions on lung biopsy
3. Raynaud's phenomenon or esophageal hypomotility
4. Swollen hands
5. Anti-ENA antibody N 1:10,000 and anti-U1 RNP antibody positive and anti-Sm negative

Minor criteria:

1. Alopecia
2. Leukopenia
3. Anemia
4. Pleuritis
5. Pericarditis
6. Arthritis
7. Trigeminal neuropathy
8. Malar rash
9. Thrombocytopenia
10. Mild myositis
11. History of swollen hands

==== Alarcón-Segovia criteria ====
The Alarcón-Segovia criteria require serological criteria and at least three clinical criteria, including either synovitis or myositis to qualify for a diagnosis of MCTD. It has a sensitivity of 62.5% and a specificity of 86.2%.

Serological criteria:

- Anti-RNP antibody titer N 1:1000

Clinical criteria:

1. Edema in hands
2. Synovitis
3. Myositis
4. Raynaud's phenomenon
5. Acrosclerosis

==== Kasukawa criteria ====
The Kasukawa criteria require a minimum of one of the common symptoms, a positive anti-RNP antibody, as well as one or more symptoms of the mixed symptoms in at least two of the three disease categories to qualify for a diagnosis of MCTD. It has a sensitivity of 75% and a specificity of 99.8%.

Common symptoms:

1. Raynaud's phenomenon
2. Swollen fingers or hands anti-RNP antibody positive

Mixed symptoms:

1. SLE-like symptoms:
  - Polyarthritis
  - Lymphadenopathy
  - Facial erythema
  - Pericarditis or pleuritis
  - Leukopenia or thrombocytopenia
2. SSc-like findings:
  - Sclerodactyly
  - Pulmonary fibrosis, restrictive changes of lung, or reduced diffusion capacity
  - Hypomotility or dilatation of esophagus
3. PM-like findings:
  - Muscle weakness
  - Elevated serum levels of muscle enzymes (CPK)
  - Myogenic pattern on EMG

==== Kahn criteria ====
The Kahn criteria require serological criteria in addition to Raynaud's phenomenon and two out of the three symptoms listed below (swelling of the fingers, myositis, and synovitis) to qualify for a diagnosis of MCTD. It has a sensitivity of 63% and a specificity of 86%.

Serological criteria:

- Presence of high titer anti-RNP antibody corresponding to speckled ANA at titer ≥ 1 : 2000

Clinical criteria:

1. Raynaud's phenomenon
2. Synovitis
3. Myositis
4. Swollen fingers

== Treatment ==
MCTD has no specific treatment. Management should address the individual's primary issues, such as arthritis, skin disease, or visceral involvement. Low-dose glucocorticoids, nonsteroidal anti-inflammatory medications, hydroxychloroquine, or a combination of these therapies can effectively treat many patients.

Fever, tiredness, unspecific arthralgias, or myalgias are commonly treated with nonsteroidal anti-inflammatory medications (NSAIDs), hydroxychloroquine, or a low dose of prednisone, depending on the severity.

Mild joint involvement can be effectively treated with NSAIDs, hydroxychloroquine, and oral prednisone. Methotrexate has been observed to be useful in more severe cases. If methotrexate is contraindicated, alternative disease-modifying medications for RA, such as leflunomide or azathioprine, may be used. High dosages of corticosteroids are typically effective in treating acute severe myositis.

Topical steroids, prednisone, and/or hydroxychloroquine are useful in treating SLE-like skin rash, oral ulcers, and photosensitivity. Steroid treatment is often effective in treating sclerodermatous skin symptoms. Raynaud's phenomenon in MCTD typically responds to vasodilator therapy such as calcium channel blockers, as well as preventive measures including avoiding cold temperatures, smoking, and sympathomimetic drugs. Warming and protecting the fingers are also important.

Recent breakthroughs have increased the therapy choices available to people with pulmonary hypertension. To ensure early detection, all individuals with MCTD must have screening echocardiography and high-resolution computed tomography upon diagnosis. Mild cases require regular testing to monitor for progression. Traditional therapies such as calcium channel blockers, ACE inhibitors, immunosuppression, and heart failure medications can be used. Pericarditis is typically treated with NSAIDs and/or corticosteroids based on severity. For moderate to severe myocarditis, high-dose steroid therapy should be combined with standard congestive heart failure treatment.

Treatment for gastrointestinal problems in MCTD is identical to that for systemic sclerosis. First-line treatment for chronic reflux symptoms includes proton-pump inhibitors, H2-receptor antagonists, lifestyle changes, and oesophageal PH monitoring. Kidney involvement can lead to nephrotic syndrome, which may be treated with high-dose corticosteroid therapy. Corticosteroids are used to treat nervous system involvement in low-dose oral, high-dose oral, or high-dose intravenous regimens, depending on the severity of the potential harm.

== Outlook ==
The long-term course of MCTD may vary. Long-term follow-up studies have shown that MCTD can progress to a moderate disease with a favorable prognosis, or patients can acquire a significant condition with vascular alterations driven by pulmonary hypertension and increased mortality. Approximately one-third of people with MCTD have a benign course and go into remission, while the other one-third have a more aggressive course with a poor response to treatment. Approximately one-third of MCTD patients improved with immunosuppressive medication but continued to require immunosuppressive therapy after several years. The prevalence of pulmonary hypertension was related to the worst prognosis and a high mortality rate, making it the most significant complication in MCTD.

== Epidemiology ==
There is currently very little epidemiologic data on MCTD. Japan's statewide multicenter collaborative survey found a prevalence of 2.7% for MCTD. Globally, the prevalence of MCTD has been reported to be significantly lower. While there are ethnic differences in the development of anti-RNP antibodies and the prevalence of MCTD, the rate of clinical manifestations among patients from different ethnic groups remains consistent. MCTD is more frequent in women than men. A Japanese nationwide survey indicated a 16:1 female-to-male ratio for MCTD, while a longitudinal prospective clinical series from a tertiary referral institution in the midwestern US found an 11:1 ratio of women to men.

== History ==
Gordon C. Sharp first described mixed connective tissue disease (MCTD) in 1972 as an entity with mixed features of systemic sclerosis (SSc), systemic lupus erythematosus (SLE), polymyositis/dermatomyositis (PM/DM), and rheumatoid arthritis (RA) along with an elevated level of high-titre anti-U1small nuclear (sn) anti-ribonucleoprotein (anti-RNP) antibodies.

== See also ==
- Overlap syndrome
- Undifferentiated connective tissue disease
