= Rigerimod =

Type of polypeptide

Rigerimod (IPP-201101, Lupuzor) is a polypeptide corresponding to the sequence 131-151 of the 70k snRNP protein with a serine phosphorylated in position 140.

It gave encouraging results in a phase IIb trial for severe lupus. Another phase IIb trial has started recruiting in the US.
