= Braverman's sign =

- Differential diagnosis: Connective tissue disease

Braverman's sign is a dermatological sign that consists of fine telangiectasias around the nail (periungually). They may be associated with connective tissue diseases. The sign is named after the dermatologist Irwin M. Braverman.
