= Sclerodactyly =

Hardening of finger or toe skin into a claw-like shape

- Specialty: Dermatology

Sclerodactyly is a localized thickening and tightness of the skin of the fingers or toes that yields a characteristic claw-like appearance and spindle shape of the affected digits, and renders them immobile or of limited mobility. The thickened, discolored patches of skin are called morphea, and may involve connective tissue below the skin, as well as muscle and other tissues. Sclerodactyly is often preceded by months or even years by Raynaud's phenomenon when it is part of systemic scleroderma.

The term "sclerodactyly" comes from Greek skleros 'hard' and daktylos 'digit'.

It is generally associated with systemic scleroderma and mixed connective tissue disease, and auto-immune disorders.

Sclerodactyly is one component of the limited cutaneous form of systemic sclerosis (lcSSc), also known as CREST syndrome (CREST is an acronym that stands for calcinosis, Raynaud's phenomenon, esophageal dysmotility, sclerodactyly, and telangiectasia.) Sclerodactyly is also one component of Huriez Syndrome, along with palmoplantar keratoderma and skin cancer. Sclerodactyly sometimes arises as a complication of the microvascular changes seen in diabetes mellitus, and is in this case referred to as diabetic sclerodactyly.

Treatment of sclerodactyly is by physical therapy, phototherapy, surgery, topical corticosteroids or vitamin D analogues, and systemic immunosuppressive drugs when the condition is part of systemic scleroderma. Localized treatment won't halt systemic disease, but can restore function and cosmetic aspects of the affected digits. The mild to moderate proximal interphalangeal (PIP) joint flexion and extension contractures and stiff distal interphalangeal (DIP) joints in slight flexion often seen in sclerodactyly can be addressed somewhat with physical therapy. In a few cases when immune involvement isn't apparent (in these cases environmental causes are suspected), the condition may gradually clear up by itself If the trigger is avoided. In other cases, early treatment while the disease is in the inflammatory stage is much more likely to be successful than on established lesions.

== See also ==
- Hand eczema
- Atopic dermatitis
