= CREST syndrome =

Connective tissue disorder

- Other names: Calcinosis-Raynaud phenomenon-esophageal involvement-sclerodactyly-telangiectasia syndrome
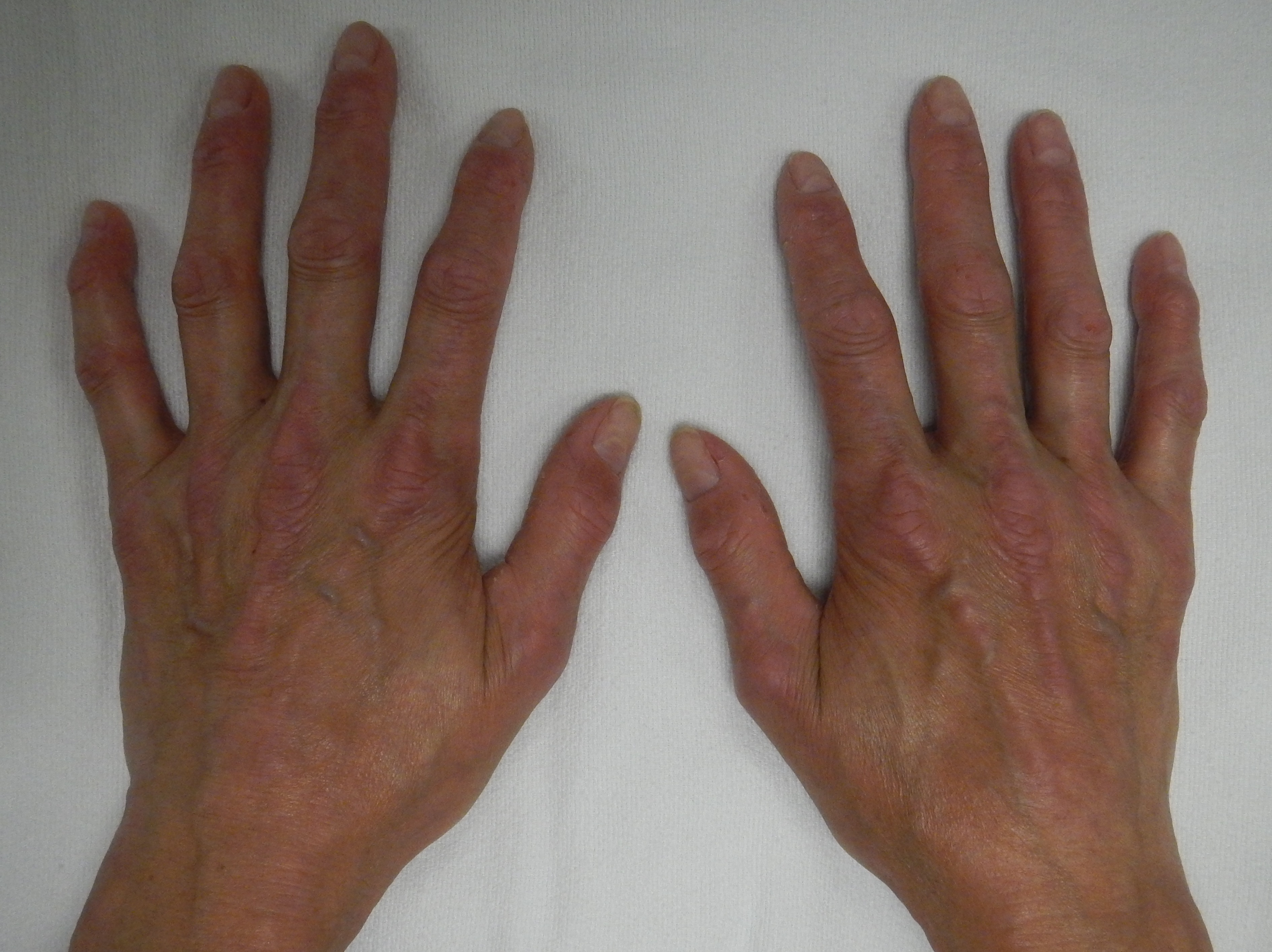
- CREST syndrome (calcinosis and sclerodactyly)
- Specialty: Rheumatology

CREST syndrome, also known as the limited cutaneous form of systemic sclerosis (lcSSc), is a multisystem connective tissue disorder. The acronym "CREST" refers to the five main features: calcinosis, Raynaud's phenomenon, esophageal dysmotility, sclerodactyly, and telangiectasia.

CREST syndrome is associated with detectable antibodies against centromeres (a component of the cell nucleus), and usually spares the kidneys (a feature more common in the related condition systemic scleroderma). If the lungs are involved, it is usually in the form of pulmonary arterial hypertension.

== Signs and symptoms ==
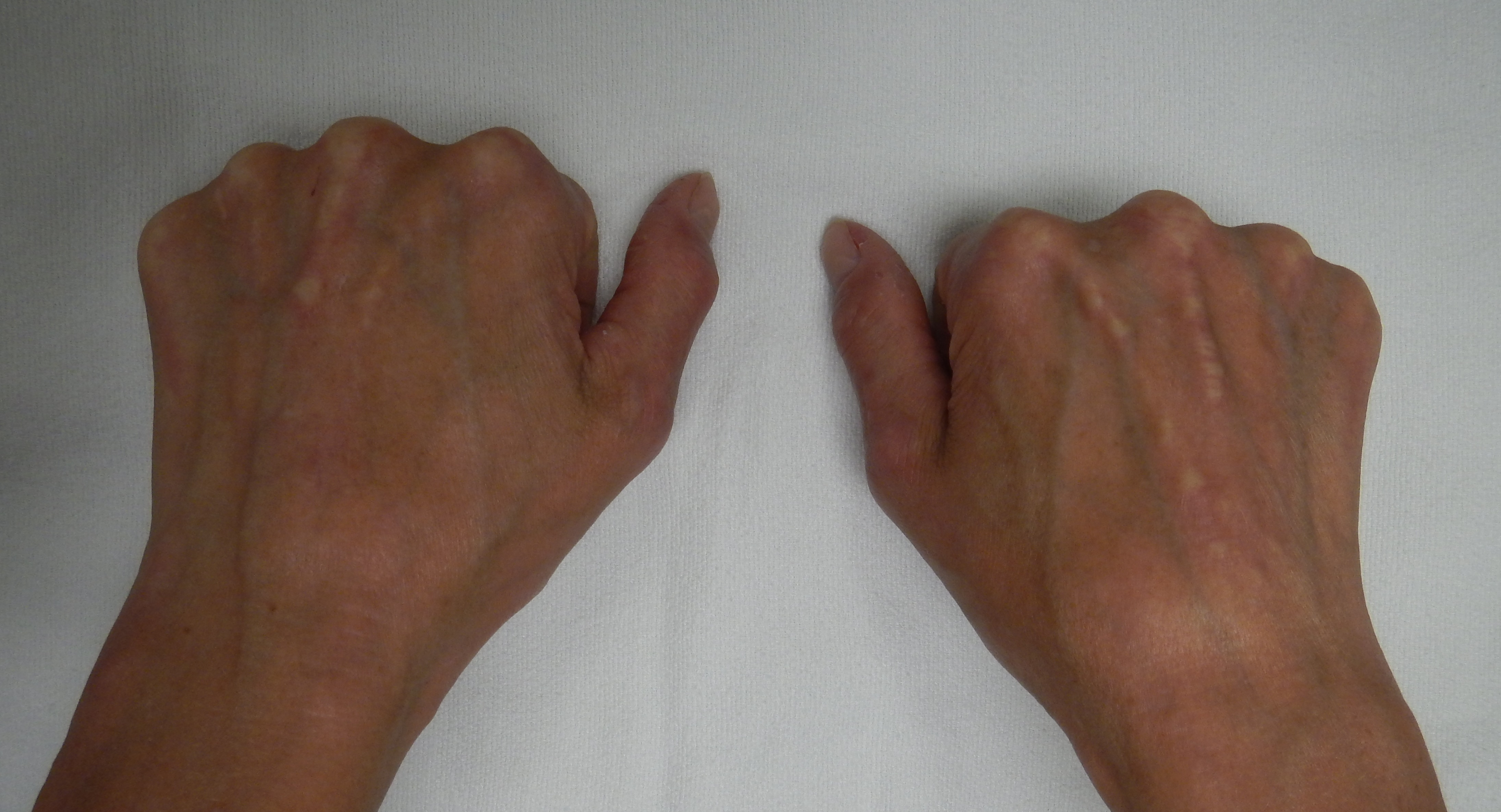
CREST syndrome (calcinosis and sclerodactyly)

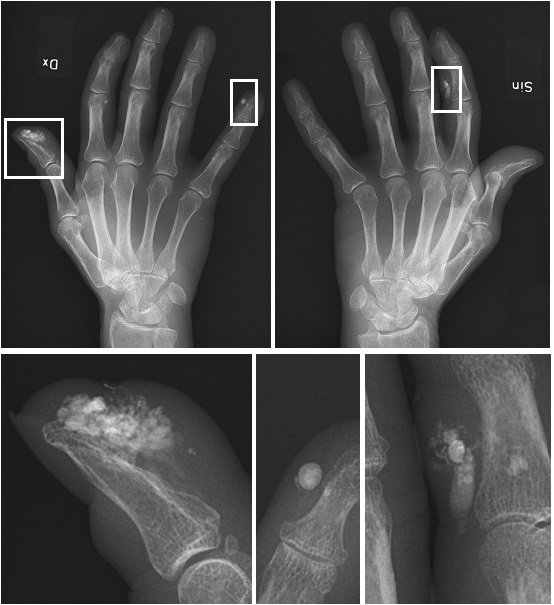
X-rays showing calcinosis in a woman with CREST syndrome

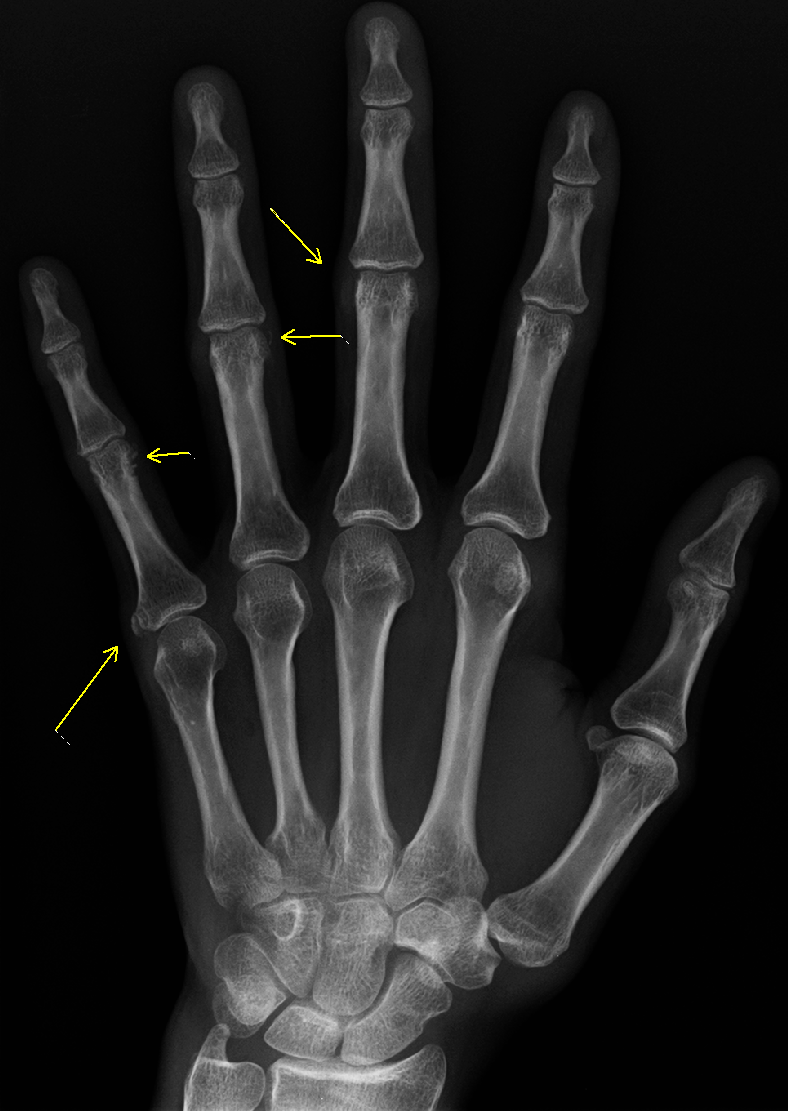
X-ray of subtle calcifications in CREST syndrome

=== Calcinosis ===
CREST causes thickening and tightening of the skin with deposition of calcific nodules ("calcinosis").

=== Raynaud's phenomenon ===
Raynaud's phenomenon is frequently the first manifestation of CREST/lcSSc, preceding other symptoms by years. Stress and cold temperature induce an exaggerated vasoconstriction of the small arteries, arterioles, and thermoregulatory vessels of the skin of the digits. Clinically this manifests as a white-blue-red transition in skin color. Underlying this transition is pallor and cyanosis of the digits, followed by a reactive hyperemia as they rewarm. When extreme and frequent, this phenomenon can lead to digital ulcerations, gangrene, or amputation. Ulceration can predispose to chronic infections of the involved site.

=== Esophageal dysmotility ===
Presents as a sensation of food getting stuck (dysphagia) in the mid- or lower esophagus, atypical chest pain, or cough. People often state they must drink liquids to swallow solid food. This motility problem results from atrophy of the gastrointestinal tract wall smooth muscle. This change may occur with or without pathologic evidence of significant tissue fibrosis.

=== Sclerodactyly ===
Though it is the most easily recognizable manifestation, it is not prominent in all patients. Thickening generally only involves the skin of the fingers distal to the metacarpophalangeal joints in CREST. Early in the course of the disease, the skin may appear edematous and inflamed. Eventually, dermal fibroblasts overproduce extracellular matrix leading to increased tissue collagen deposition in the skin. Collagen cross-linking then causes a progressive skin tightening. Digital ischemic ulcers commonly form on the distal fingers in 30–50% of patients.

=== Telangiectasias ===
Marked telangiectasias (dilated capillaries) occur on the skin of the face, the palmar surface of the hands, and the mucous membranes. Telangiectasias tend to be more numerous in people with other scleroderma related vascular disease (i.e., pulmonary arterial hypertension). The number of telangiectasias and the sites involved tend to increase over time.

=== Other ===
Other symptoms of CREST syndrome can be exhaustion, weakness, difficulties with breathing, pain in hands and feet, dizziness and badly healing wounds.

Patients with lcSSc commonly develop pulmonary artery hypertension which may result in cor pulmonale (heart failure due to increased pulmonary artery pressure).

== Cause ==
CREST syndrome involves the production of autoimmune anti-nuclear (ANA) and anti-centromere antibodies (ACA), though their cause is not currently understood. There is no known infectious cause.

== Diagnosis ==
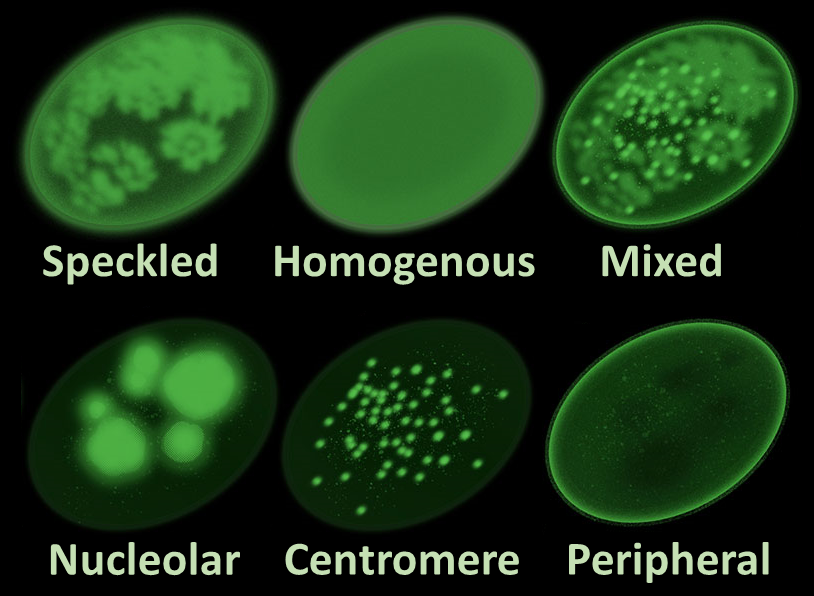
Main antinuclear antibody patterns on immunofluorescence. CREST syndrome typically displays the centromere pattern.

CREST is not easily diagnosed as it closely mimics symptoms of other connective tissue and autoimmune diseases. Diagnoses are usually given when a patient presents two or more of the five major clinical symptoms. Additionally, blood can be tested for positive ANA and ACA, and skin biopsies can be taken to help confirm a diagnosis.

== Treatment ==
Disease progression may be slowed with immunosuppressives and other medications, and esophageal reflux, pulmonary hypertension and Raynaud phenomenon may benefit from symptomatic treatment. However, there is no cure for this disease as there is no cure for scleroderma in general.

== Epidemiology ==
CREST syndrome can be noted in up to 10% of patients with primary biliary cholangitis.

=== History ===
The combination of symptoms was first reported in 1964 by R.H. Winterbauer, at that point a medical student at Johns Hopkins School of Medicine.

== See also ==
- Scleroderma
