= Anti-nRNP =

Autoantibody

Anti-nRNP is a type of antibody.

They are autoantibodies against some ribonucleoproteins.

Anti-nRNP antibodies can be elevated in mixed connective tissue disease.

== Anti-nRNP antibody ==
Anti-nuclear Ribonucleoprotein (Anti-nRNP) antibodies are a type of autoantibody, which are antibodies that wrongly target and attack a person's own cells, proteins or tissues. In particular, anti-nRNPs are directed against nuclear ribonucleoproteins (nRNPs), which are complexes composed of proteins and nucleic acids. These ribonucleoproteins play a critical role in various cellular processes, including RNA processing and gene expression.

Anti-U1 RNP antibodies target proteins that are part of the U1 small nuclear ribonucleoprotein (U1-snRNP) complex. This complex is involved in RNA splicing, a process that removes non-coding regions from pre-messenger RNA before it is translated into proteins. Because RNA splicing is necessary for normal cell function, problems involving the U1-snRNP complex are associated with several autoimmune connective tissue diseases. Although researchers do not understand why anti-U1 RNP antibodies develop, studies suggest that both genetic and environmental factors contribute to the loss of immune tolerance that allows these antibodies to form.

Overview of RNA splicing by small nuclear ribonucleoproteins (snRNPs). The U1-snRNP complex is one of the snRNPs involved in removing introns from pre-messenger RNA.

Anti-U1 RNP antibodies can be detected using blood tests such as enzyme-linked immunosorbent assay (ELISA), immunoblotting, and multiplex immunoassays. These tests are usually performed after a positive antinuclear antibody (ANA) test or when a patient has symptoms of an autoimmune connective tissue disease. The antibodies can also be found in other autoimmune disorders; the results are interpreted together with a patient's symptoms and other findings instead of being used to make a diagnosis.

== Background ==
The human immune system relies on antibodies; these are specialized proteins produced by B cells in response to the presence of antigens. Antigens are typically foreign molecules that are parts of bacteria, viruses, or other pathogens that trigger an immune response. Antibodies bind to these antigens to neutralize them, block their activity, or mark them for destruction by other immune system cells.

The immune system fails to distinguish between self and non-self, a process called immune tolerance. In normal conditions, the immune system is trained to recognize the body's cells or proteins and is labeled as "self" while identifying harmful substances as "non-self". This causes it to produce autoantibodies that target the body's own healthy tissues. Autoantibodies can cause inflammation, tissue damage, and contribute to the progression of various chronic diseases.

Some people may inherit genes that increase their risk of developing autoimmune disease, while other triggers such as viral infections or immune system stressors may add to the loss of immune tolerance. When this happens, the immune system starts to recognize some of the body's own proteins as foreign and produces antibodies to fight against them. Anti-U1 RNP antibodies are one example. However, not everyone who inherits genetic risk will develop a disease. Many factors can work together before the immune system begins attacking the body's own tissues.

== Target ==
Anti-nRNP antibodies target small nuclear ribonucleoproteins (snRNPs). They specifically target the U1-snRNP complex, which is a part of the spliceosome. The spliceosome is an essential cellular component responsible for the removal of introns from pre-messenger RNA, an important step in processing genetic information before it is translated into proteins. The spliceosome is made up of 5 different complexes, U1, U2, U4, U5, and U6. All of these complexes contain the same 7 Sm proteins. U1-snRNP is made up of the 7 core Sm proteins, U1-RNA, and 3 unique proteins. The proteins most commonly targeted within the complex are RNP68/70, RNPA, and RNPC.

The U1-snRNP complex recognizes the beginning of an intron during RNA splicing, making it the first step in the process. Because of its important role, proteins within the U1 complex are highly conserved and are found in almost every cell in the human body.

Patients may produce antibodies against several proteins within the U1-snRNp complex, so the antibody pattern can be different depending on each individual. The U1 snRNP complex contains several proteins, including U1-70K, U1-A, and U1-C, along with small nuclear RNA and Sm proteins. Autoantibodies most commonly recognize the U1-70K protein, although antibodies against other proteins in the complex may also occur. Researchers have found that patients may produce antibodies against one or several of these proteins, and the specific antibody pattern can vary between individuals.

Although the exact reason these proteins become targets of the immune system is not completely understood, they are thought to become exposed during inflammation or other changes within the cell. Once immune tolerance is lost, B lymphocytes produce anti-U1 RNP antibodies that recognize components of the U1 snRNP complex. While these antibodies are primarily used as biomarkers for autoimmune disease, studies continue to investigate whether they also contribute to inflammation and disease progression.

== Testing ==
Diagram showing the role of the U1 small nuclear ribonucleoprotein (U1snRNP) complex during RNA splicing.

An enzyme-linked immunosorbent assay (ELISA) is one of the most common ways for detecting anti-U1 RNP antibodies in patient sera. In this procedure, purified or recombinant U1-RNP antigens are placed into microplate wells. After nonspecific binding sites are blocked, diluted patient serum is added to the wells and incubated. If specific autoantibodies are present, they can bind to the immobilized antigen. A secondary enzyme-conjugated anti-human IgG antibody is added, that it is followed by a substrate that produces a color change. This is read by spectrophotometry and compared to a standard curve to measure the levels of antibodies. Reference ranges are specific to each laboratory, and results must be interpreted in the context of clinical findings. This method is highly sensitive and frequently used to support diagnosis in patients with suspected MCTD or other connective tissue diseases.

Other laboratory techniques include immunoblotting, immunoprecipitation, and multiplex immunoassays. Immunoblotting identifies antibodies directed against specific proteins within the U1 snRNP complex, while immunoprecipitation has traditionally been considered one of the most specific methods for confirming anti-U1 RNP antibodies. Multiplex immunoassays allow laboratories to detect several extracellular nuclear antigen antibodies at the same time, making them useful for evaluating those with suspected autoimmune diseases.

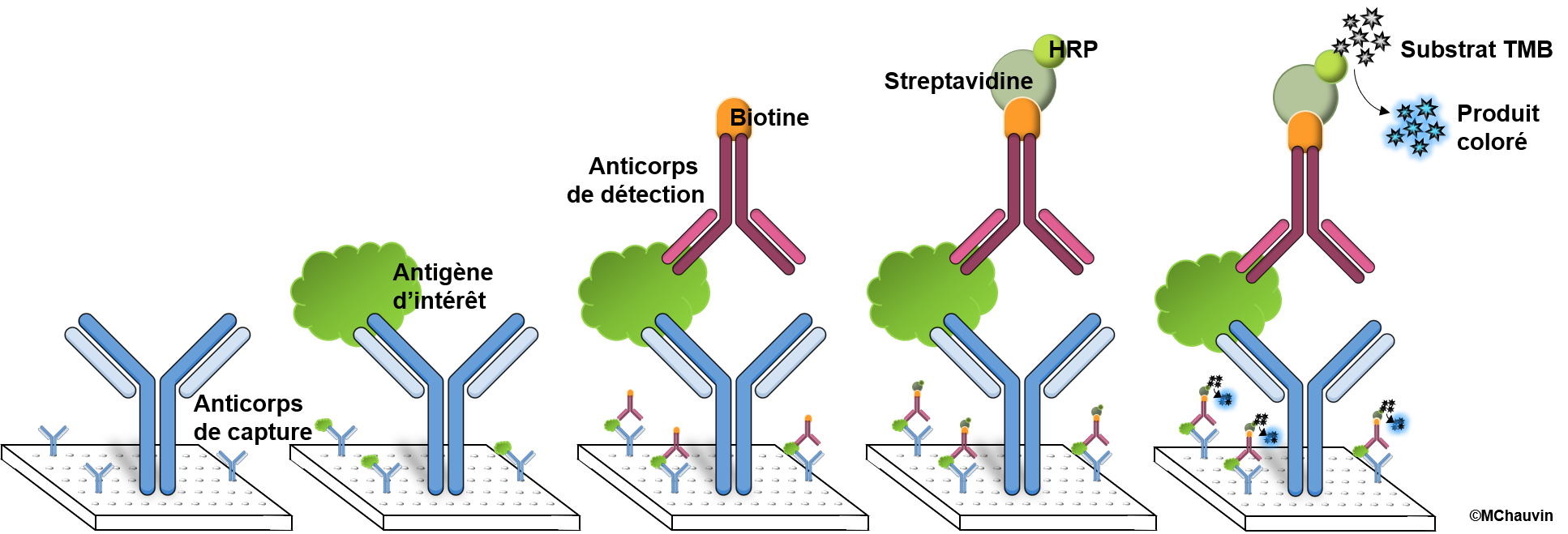
Principle of an enzyme-linked immunosorbent assay (ELISA) used to detect antibodies.

Because testing methods differ between laboratories, reference ranges may vary. A positive anti-U1 RNP antibody test should always be interpreted together with a patient's symptoms and other significant research.

== Clinical significance ==
Anti-nRNP antibodies are most strongly associated with Mixed Connective Tissue Disease (MCTD), a condition that exhibits overlapping symptoms with systemic lupus erythematosus (SLE), scleroderma, and rheumatoid arthritis. The detection of high titers of anti-U1 snRNP antibodies in the sera of patients is considered a hallmark of MCTD and is commonly used in its diagnosis.

In addition to MCTD, anti-nRNP antibodies have been observed in a variety of other autoimmune disorders including:

- Systemic Lupus Erythematosus (SLE)
- Systemic Sclerosis (SS)
- Primary Sjögren's Syndrome (pSS)
- Raynaud's phenomenon
- Scleroderma
- Rheumatoid Arthritis

The addition of anti-U1 RNP antibodies reveals that many autoimmune diseases share symptoms such as joint pain, fatigue, and Raynaud's phenomenon. The pathogenic role of anti-nRNP antibodies in these diseases varies, and their presence may only reflect immune system deregulation rather than being the direct cause of disease symptoms. Yet, they have served as valuable biomarkers.

== Interpretation of results ==
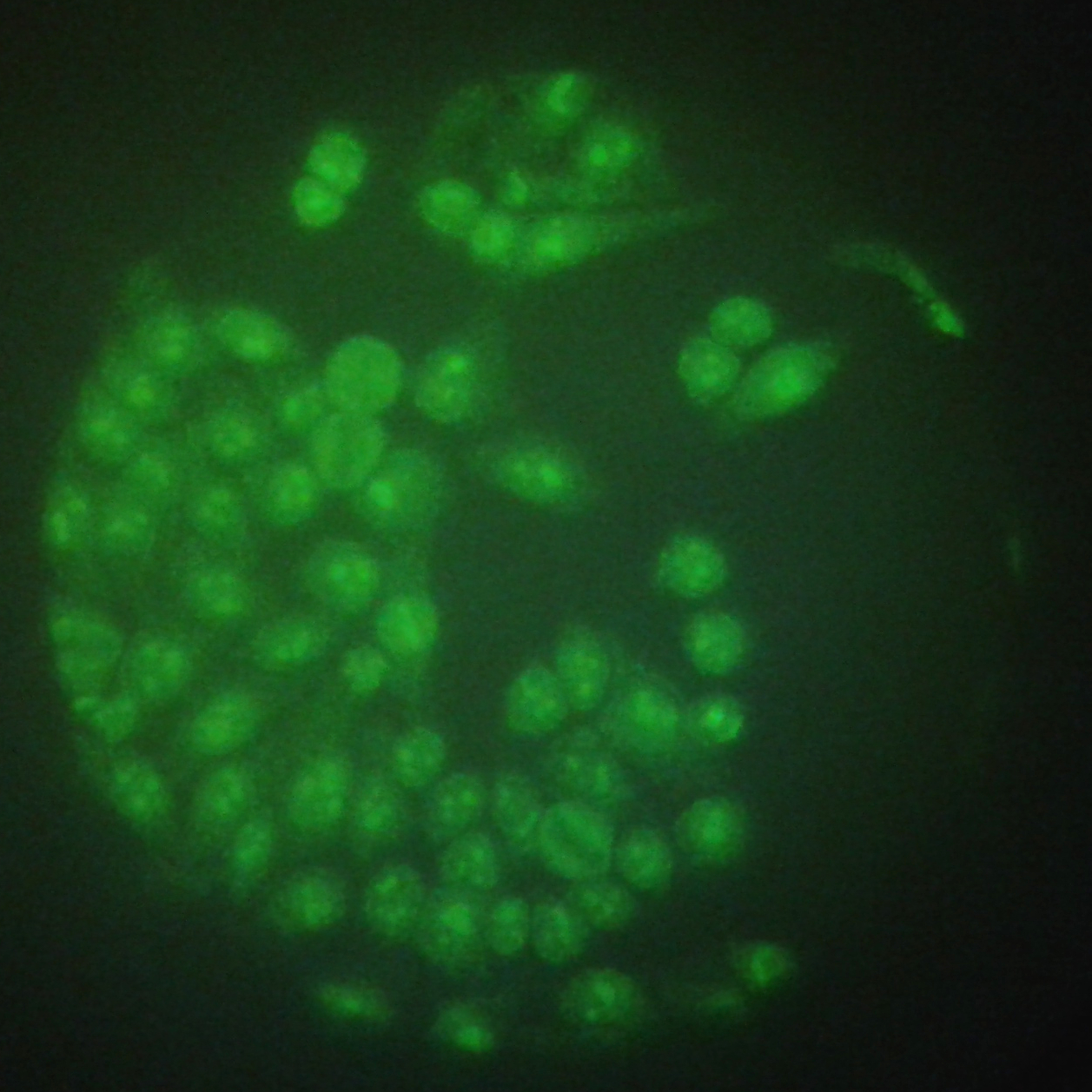
Indirect immunofluorescence on HEp-2 cells is used during antinuclear antibody (ANA) testing. A positive ANA test is often followed by testing for specific autoantibodies such as anti-U1 RNP antibodies.

A positive anti-U1 RNP antibody test does not automatically mean that a person has an autoimmune disease. Although these antibodies are most strongly associated with mixed connective tissue, they may also be found in disorders and, in some cases, low levels in healthy individuals. For this reason, laboratory results are interpreted within the context of the paitents' overal clicical presentation.

Anti-U1 RNP antibody testing is usually performed after a positive antinuclear antibody (ANA) test as part of an extractable nuclear antigen (ENA) panel. Healthcare providers can view the results together with the patient's symptoms, history, and exam. When high antibody levels are present together with symptoms consistent with mixed connective tissue disease, the findings strongly support that diagnosis.

Because antibodies may always remain present for many years, repeat testing is not always necessary unless a healthcare provider is extensively evaluating new symptoms or considering a different diagnosis. Prescribers use test results, and they will always be interpreted by a healthcare professional who can determine whether the findings are consistent with an autoimmune connective tissue disease. When combined with other laboratory tests and clinical findings, anti-U1 RNP antibody testing provides valuable information that helps support research and guide health management.

== History ==
Anti-U1 RNP antibodies were first described in the early 1970s during studies of patients with mixed connective tissue disease. In 1972, rheumatologist Dr, Gordon Sharp and colleagues identified antibodies directed against extractable nuclear antigens (ENAs) in patients who had symptoms of several autoimmune connective tissue diseases. Their work helped establish mixed connective tissue disease (MCTD) as a distinct clinical syndrome and made anti-U1 RNP antibodies an important laboratory discovery in rheumatology.

The discovery of anti-U1 RNP antibodies also improved the understanding of autoimmune connective tissue disease. Before these antibodies were identified, many patients with overlapping symptoms were difficult to classify because their conditions shared characteristics of several different autoimmune disorders. Identifying anti-U1 RNP antibodies gave healthcare physicians another way to recognize patterns of disease and support the diagnosis of mixed connective tissue disease. Although the antibodies are not exclusive to MCTD, they remain one of the most characteristic scientific findings associated with the condition.

Since their discovery, advances in immunology and laboratory testing have improved the ability to detect anti-U1 RNP antibodies. Early testing methods were time-consuming and performed mainly in research laboratories, but newer techniques such as enzyme-linked immunosorbent assays (ELISA), immunoblotting, and multiplex immunoassays have made testing faster and more widely available. Today, anti-U1 RNP antibodies are routinely included in autoimmune antibody panels used to evaluate patients with suspected connective tissue disease. Researchers continue to study these antibodies to understand their role in autoimmune disease.

== See also ==
- snRNP70
