= Anti-Scl-70 antibodies =

Anti-topoisomerase antibody

Anti-Scl-70 (also called anti-topoisomerase I after the type I topoisomerase target) is an anti-topoisomerase antibody-type of anti-nuclear autoantibodies, seen mainly in diffuse systemic scleroderma (with a sensitivity of 28–70%), but is also seen in 10–18% of cases of the more limited form of systemic scleroderma called CREST syndrome. Anti Scl-70 antibodies are associated with more severe scleroderma disease.

The etymology of scl-70 consists of an abbreviation of scleroderma and a 70 kD extractable immunoreactive fragment that can be obtained from the otherwise larger (100–105 kD) target topoisomerase antigen (called the SCL-70 Antigen) of the antibodies.
