= SnRNP70 =

Protein-coding gene in the species Homo sapiens

SNRNP70
Available structures
PDB	Ortholog search: PDBe RCSB
PDB	List of PDB id codes 2L5I, 2L5J, 3CW1, 3PGW, 4PJO, 4PKD

Identifiers
- Aliases: SNRNP70, RNPU1Z, RPU1, SNRP70, Snp1, U1-70K, U170K, U1AP, U1RNP, SnRNP70, small nuclear ribonucleoprotein U1 subunit 70
- External IDs: OMIM: 180740; MGI: 98341; HomoloGene: 20672; GeneCards: SNRNP70; OMA:SNRNP70 - orthologs

Gene location (Human)
Chr.	Chromosome 19 (human)
Band	19q13.33	Start	49,085,419 bp
Band	19q13.33	End	49,108,605 bp

Gene location (Mouse)
Chr.	Chromosome 7 (mouse)
Band	7 B3|7 29.28 cM	Start	45,025,877 bp
Band	7 B3|7 29.28 cM	End	45,045,166 bp
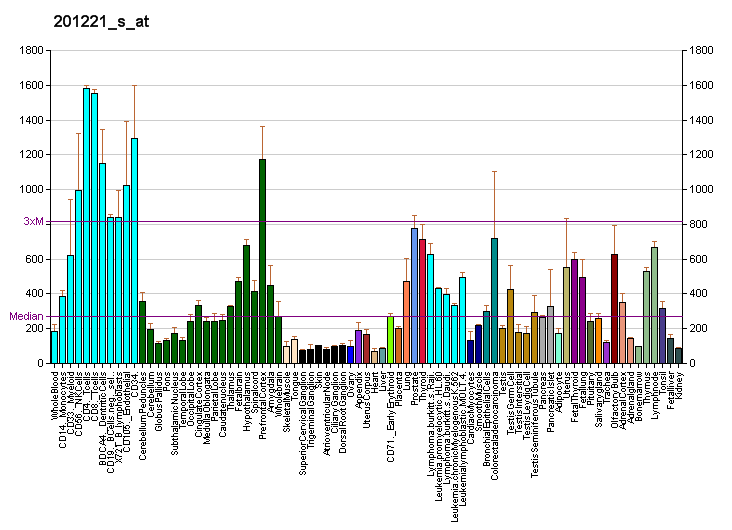
RNA expression pattern
Bgee	Human / Mouse (ortholog); Top expressed in: right hemisphere of cerebellum; sural nerve; right uterine tube; right lobe of thyroid gland; left ovary; body of uterus; right ovary; left lobe of thyroid gland; canal of the cervix; body of pancreas / Top expressed in: neural layer of retina; genital tubercle; tail of embryo; primary visual cortex; superior frontal gyrus; ventricular zone; yolk sac; dentate gyrus of hippocampal formation granule cell; lip; epiblast; More reference expression data
BioGPS	More reference expression data
Gene ontology
Molecular function	protein binding; nucleic acid binding; mRNA binding; U1 snRNP binding; U1 snRNA binding; RNA binding
Cellular component	nuclear speck; nucleoplasm; precatalytic spliceosome; spliceosomal complex; commitment complex; U2-type prespliceosome; nucleus; U1 snRNP; cytoplasm
Biological process	mRNA splicing, via spliceosome; positive regulation of mRNA splicing, via spliceosome; mRNA processing; negative regulation of chaperone-mediated autophagy; regulation of RNA splicing; RNA splicing; regulation of ATP-dependent activity; negative regulation of protein refolding; cellular response to tumor necrosis factor; cellular response to retinoic acid; cellular response to transforming growth factor beta stimulus
Sources:Amigo / QuickGO
Orthologs
Species	Human	Mouse
Entrez	6625	20637
Ensembl	ENSG00000104852	ENSMUSG00000063511
UniProt	P08621	Q62376
RefSeq (mRNA)	NM_001009820; NM_001301069; NM_003089	NM_009224
RefSeq (protein)	NP_001287998; NP_003080	NP_033250
Location (UCSC)	Chr 19: 49.09 – 49.11 Mb	Chr 7: 45.03 – 45.05 Mb
PubMed search
- Wikidata
View/Edit Human	View/Edit Mouse

snRNP70 also known as U1 small nuclear ribonucleoprotein 70 kDa is a protein that in humans is encoded by the SNRNP70 gene. snRNP70 is a small nuclear ribonucleoprotein that associates with U1 spliceosomal RNA, forming the U1snRNP a core component of the spliceosome. The U1-70K protein and other components of the spliceosome complex form detergent-insoluble aggregates in both sporadic and familial human cases of Alzheimer's disease. U1-70K co-localizes with Tau in neurofibrillary tangles in Alzheimer's disease.

== Interactions ==
snRNP70 has been shown to interact with ASF/SF2, SRPK1, and ZRANB2.

== Role in autoimmunity ==
Antibodies towards snRNP70 are associated with mixed connective tissue disease.
