= Telangiectasia =

Small dilated blood vessels

- Other names: Spider veins, angioectasias
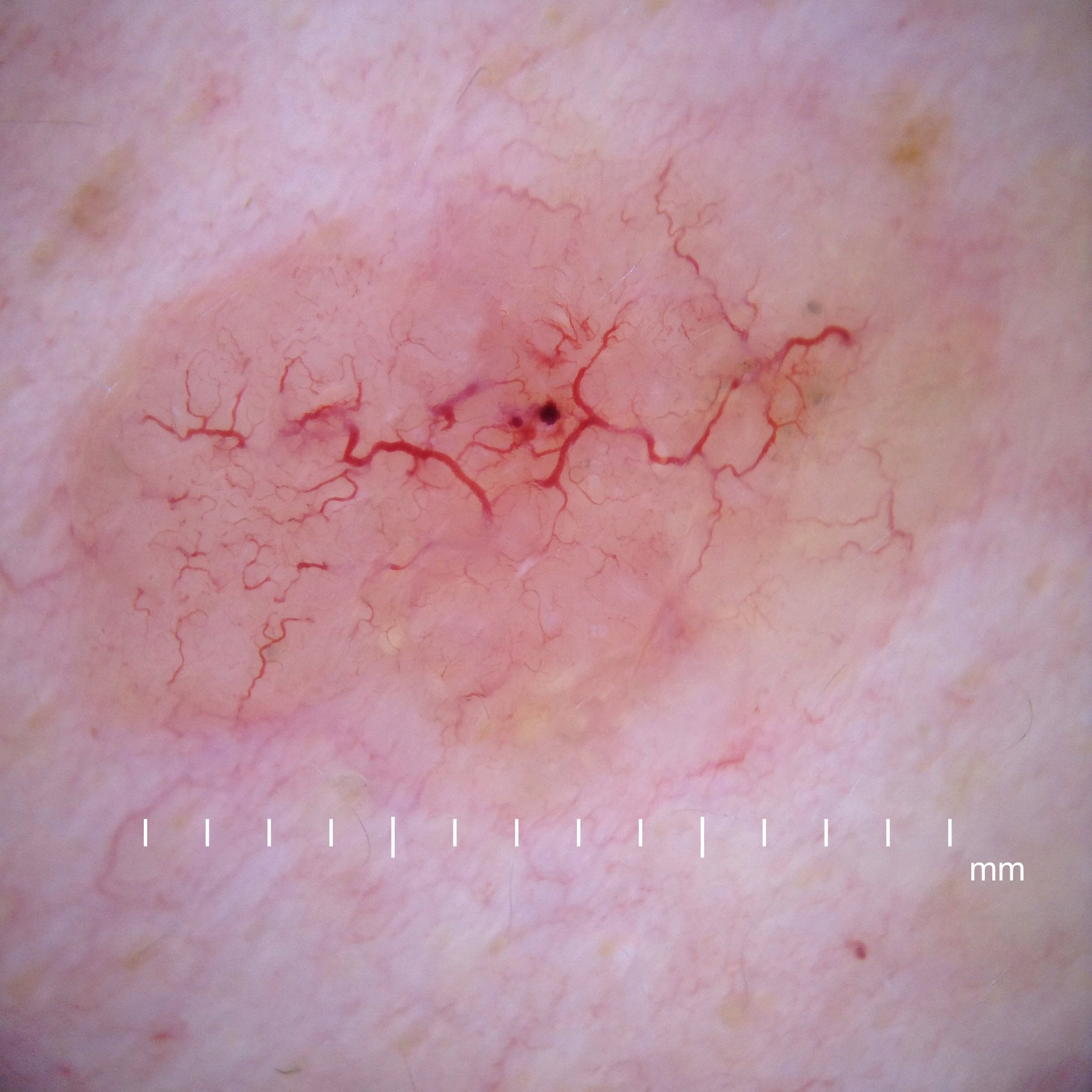
- Telangiectasia as seen in a basal-cell carcinoma
- Pronunciation: /tɛlˌændʒiɛkˈteɪziə/
- Specialty: Dermatology

Telangiectasias (from tel- 'end', angi- 'blood vessel' and ectasia 'the expansion of a hollow or tubular organ'), also known as spider veins, are small dilated blood vessels that can occur near the surface of the skin or mucous membranes, measuring between 0.5 and 1 millimeter in diameter. These dilated blood vessels can develop anywhere on the body but are commonly seen on the face around the nose, cheeks and chin. Dilated blood vessels can also develop on the legs, although when they occur on the legs, they often have underlying venous reflux or "hidden varicose veins" (see Venous hypertension section below). When found on the legs, they are found specifically on the upper thigh, below the knee joint and around the ankles.

Many patients with spider veins seek the assistance of physicians who specialize in vein care or peripheral vascular disease. These physicians are called vascular surgeons or phlebologists. More recently, interventional radiologists have started treating venous problems.

Some telangiectasias are due to developmental abnormalities that can closely mimic the behaviour of benign vascular neoplasms. They may be composed of abnormal aggregations of arterioles, capillaries or venules. Because telangiectasias are vascular lesions, they blanch when tested with diascopy.

Telangiectasias, aside from presenting in many other conditions, are one of the features of the acronymically named CREST syndrome, a form of systemic scleroderma. The syndrome recognises the significantly co-presenting symptoms of calcinosis, Raynaud's phenomenon, esophageal dysmotility, sclerodactyly and telangiectasia.

== Causes ==
The causes of telangiectasia can be divided into congenital and acquired factors.

=== Genetic ===
Goldman states that "numerous inherited or congenital conditions display cutaneous telangiectasia". These include:

- Bloom syndrome (homozygous null mutation in BLM DNA repair enzyme. similar mechanism and etiology to ataxia telangiectasia)
- Naevus flammeus (port-wine stain)
- Klippel–Trenaunay syndrome
- Maffucci syndrome (multiple enchondromas and hemangiomas)
- Hereditary hemorrhagic telangiectasia (Osler–Weber–Rendu syndrome)
- Ataxia–telangiectasia
- Sturge–Weber syndrome, a nevus formation in the skin supplied by the trigeminal nerve and associated with facial port-wine stains, glaucoma, meningeal angiomas and intellectual disabilities
- Hypotrichosis–lymphedema–telangiectasia syndrome, caused by mutation in transcription factor SOX18

=== Venous hypertension ===
In the past, it was believed that leg varicose veins or telangiectasia were caused by high venous pressure, or venous hypertension. However it is now understood that venous reflux disease is usually the cause of these problems.

Telangiectasia in the legs is often related to the presence of venous reflux within underlying varicose veins. Flow abnormalities in smaller veins, known as reticular veins or feeder veins, under the skin can also cause spider veins to form, thereby making a recurrence of spider veins in the treated area less likely.

Factors that predispose to the development of varicose and telangiectatic leg veins include:

- Age
- Sex: It used to be thought that females were affected far more than males. However, research has shown 79% of adult males and 88% of adult females have leg telangiectasia.
- Pregnancy: Pregnancy is a key factor contributing to the formation of varicose and spider veins. Changes in hormone levels are one of the most important reasons women are more likely to develop varicose veins during pregnancy. There is an increase in progesterone, which causes the veins to relax and potentially swell more easily. There's also a significant increase in the blood volume during pregnancy, which tends to distend veins, causing valve dysfunction which leads to blood pooling in the veins. Moreover, later in pregnancy, the enlarged uterus can compress veins, causing higher vein pressure leading to dilated veins. Varicose veins that form during pregnancy may spontaneously improve or even disappear a few months after delivery.
- Lifestyle and occupation: Those who are involved with prolonged sitting or standing in their daily activities have an increased risk of developing varicose veins. The weight of the blood continuously pressing against the closed valves causes them to fail, leading to vein distention.

=== Other acquired causes ===
Acquired telangiectasia, not related to other venous abnormalities, for example on the face and trunk, can be caused by factors such as

- Cushing's syndrome
- Rosacea
- Mast cell activation syndrome (MCAS)
- Blepharitis
- Environmental damage such as that caused by sun or cold exposure
- Age
- Trauma to skin such as contusions or surgical incisions
- Radiation exposure such as that experienced during radiotherapy for the treatment of cancer, e.g., radiation proctitis
- Chemotherapy
- Carcinoid syndrome
- Limited systemic sclerosis/scleroderma (a scleroderma sub-type)
- Chronic treatment with topical corticosteroids may lead to telangiectasia.
- Spider angiomas are radial arrays of tiny arterioles, commonly occurring in pregnant women and in patients with hepatic cirrhosis, and associated with palmar erythema. In men, they are related to high estrogen levels secondary to liver disease.
- TEMPI syndrome
- Tobacco smoking
- Cutaneous collagenous vasculopathy

== Treatment ==
Before any treatment of leg telangiectasia is considered, it is essential to have duplex ultrasonography, the test that has replaced Doppler ultrasound. The reason for this is that there is a clear association between leg telangiectasia and underlying venous reflux. Research has shown that 88–89% of women with telangiectasia have refluxing reticular veins close, and 15% have incompetent perforator veins nearby. As such, it is essential to both find and treat underlying venous reflux before considering any treatment at all.

Sclerotherapy is the "gold standard" and is preferred over laser for eliminating telangiectasiae and smaller varicose leg veins. A sclerosant medication is injected into the diseased vein so it hardens and eventually shrinks away. Recent evidence with foam sclerotherapy shows that the foam containing the irritating sclerosant quickly appears in the patient's heart and lungs, and then in some cases travels through a patent foramen ovale to the brain. This has led to concerns about the safety of sclerotherapy for telangiectasias.

In some cases stroke and transient ischemic attacks have occurred after sclerotherapy. Varicose veins and reticular veins are often treated before treating telangiectasia, although treatment of these larger veins in advance of sclerotherapy for telangiectasia may not guarantee better results. Varicose veins can be treated with foam sclerotherapy, endovenous laser treatment, radiofrequency ablation, or open surgery. The biggest risk, however, seems to occur with sclerotherapy, especially in terms of systemic risk of DVT, pulmonary embolism, and stroke. Other issues which arise with the use of sclerotherapy to treat spider veins are staining, shadowing, telangiectatic matting, and ulceration. In addition, incompleteness of therapy is common, requiring multiple treatment sessions.

Telangiectasias on the face are often treated with a laser. Laser therapy uses a light beam that is pulsed onto the veins in order to seal them off, causing them to dissolve. These light-based treatments require adequate heating of the veins. These treatments can result in the destruction of sweat glands, and the risk increases with the number of treatments.
