= General anaesthetic =

Compound that induces a loss of consciousness

General anaesthetics (or anesthetics) are often defined as compounds that induce a loss of consciousness in humans or loss of righting reflex in animals. Clinical definitions are also extended to include an induced coma that causes lack of awareness to painful stimuli, sufficient to facilitate surgical applications in clinical and veterinary practice. General anaesthetics do not act as analgesics. General anaesthetics are a structurally diverse group of compounds whose mechanisms encompass multiple biological targets involved in the control of neuronal pathways. The precise workings are the subject of some debate and ongoing research.

General anesthetics elicit a state of general anesthesia. It remains somewhat controversial regarding how this state should be defined. General anesthetics, however, typically elicit several key reversible effects: immobility, analgesia, amnesia, unconsciousness, and reduced autonomic responsiveness to noxious stimuli.

== Mode of administration ==
General anaesthetics can be administered either as gases or vapours (inhalational anaesthetics), or as injections (intravenous or even intramuscular). All of these agents share the property of being quite hydrophobic (i.e., as liquids, they are not freely miscible—or mixable—in water, and as gases they dissolve in oils better than in water). It is possible to deliver anaesthesia solely by inhalation or injection, but most commonly the two forms are combined, with an injection given to induce anaesthesia and a gas used to maintain it.

=== Inhalation ===
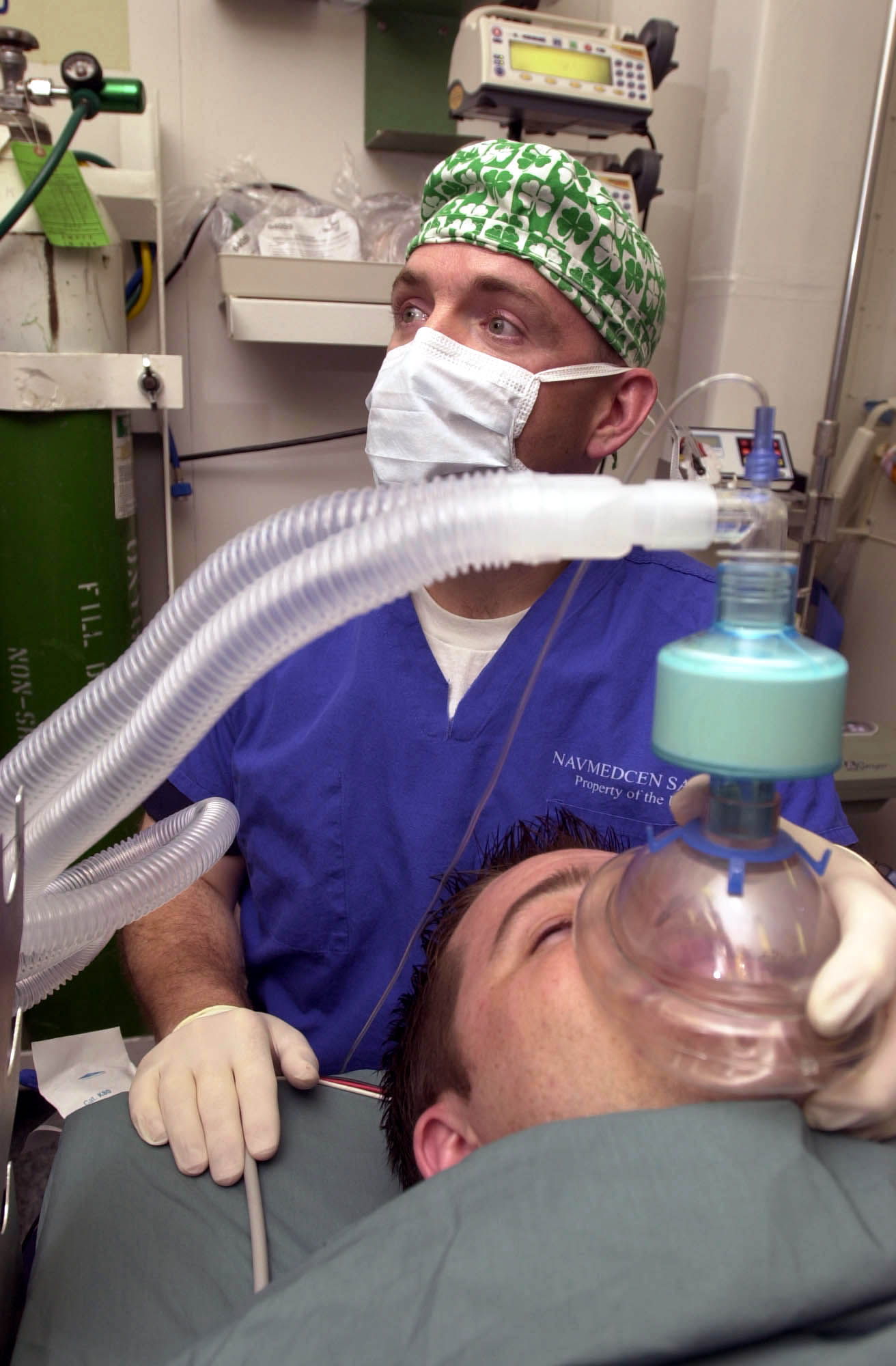
General anesthetics are frequently administered as volatile liquids or gases.

Inhalational anaesthetic substances are either volatile liquids or gases, and are usually delivered using an anaesthesia machine. An anaesthesia machine allows composing a mixture of oxygen, anaesthetics and ambient air, delivering it to the patient and monitoring patient and machine parameters. Liquid anaesthetics are vapourised in the machine.

Many compounds have been used for inhalation anaesthesia, but only a few are still in widespread use. Desflurane, isoflurane and sevoflurane are the most widely used volatile anaesthetics today. They are often combined with nitrous oxide. Older, less popular volatile anaesthetics include halothane, enflurane, and methoxyflurane. Researchers are also actively exploring the use of xenon as an anaesthetic.

=== Injection ===
Injectable anaesthetics are used for the induction and maintenance of a state of unconsciousness. Anaesthetists prefer to use intravenous injections, as they are faster, generally less painful and more reliable than intramuscular or subcutaneous injections. Among the most widely used drugs are:

- Propofol
- Etomidate
- Barbiturates such as methohexital and thiopentone/thiopental
- Benzodiazepines such as midazolam
- Ketamine is used in the UK as "field anaesthesia", for instance in road traffic incidents or similar situations where an operation must be conducted at the scene or when there is not enough time to move to an operating room, while preferring other anaesthetics where conditions allow their use. It is more frequently used in the operative setting in the US.

Benzodiazepines are sedatives and are used in combinations with other general anaesthetics.

== Mechanism of action ==
Induction and maintenance of general anesthesia, and the control of the various physiological side effects is typically achieved through a combinatorial drug approach. Individual general anesthetics vary with respect to their specific physiological and cognitive effects. While general anesthesia induction may be facilitated by one general anesthetic, others may be used in parallel or subsequently to achieve and maintain the desired anesthetic state. The drug approach utilized is dependent upon the procedure and the needs of the healthcare providers.

It is postulated that general anaesthetics exert their action by the activation of inhibitory central nervous system (CNS) receptors, and the inactivation of CNS excitatory receptors. The relative roles of different receptors is still under debate, but evidence exists for particular targets being involved with certain anaesthetics and drug effects.

Below are several key targets of general anesthetics that likely mediate their effects:

=== GABA_{A} receptor agonists ===
- GABA_{A} receptors are chloride channels that hyperpolarize neurons and function as inhibitory CNS receptors. General anesthetics that agonize them are typically used to induce a state of sedation and/or unconsciousness. Such drugs include propofol, etomidate, isoflurane, benzodiazepines (midazolam, lorazepam, diazepam), and barbiturates (sodium thiopental, methohexital).

=== NMDA receptor antagonists ===
- Ketamine, an NMDA receptor antagonist, is used primarily for its analgesic effects and in an off-label capacity for its anti-depressant effects. This drug, however, also alters arousal and is often used in parallel with other general anesthetics to help maintain a state of general anesthesia. Administration of ketamine alone leads to a dissociative state, in which a patient may experience auditory and visual hallucinations. Additionally, the perception of pain is dissociated from the perception of noxious stimuli. Ketamine appears to bind preferentially to the NMDA receptors on GABAergic interneurons, which may partially explain its effects.

=== Two-pore potassium channels (K_{2P}s) activation ===
- Two-pore potassium channels (K_{2P}s) modulate the potassium conductance that contributes to the resting membrane potential in neurons. Opening of these channels therefore facilitates a hyperpolarizing current, which reduces neuronal excitability. K_{2P}s have been found to be affected by general anesthetics (esp. halogenated inhalation anesthetics) and are currently under investigation as potential targets. The K_{2P} channel family comprises six subfamilies, which includes 15 unique members. 13 of these channels (excluding TWIK-1 and TWIK-2 homomers) are affected by general anesthetics. While it has not been determined that general anesthetics bind directly to these channels, nor is it clear how these drugs affect K_{2P} conductance, electrophysiological studies have shown that certain general anesthetics result in K_{2P} channel activation. This drug-elicited channel activation has been shown to be dependent upon specific amino-acids within certain K_{2P} channels (i.e. TREK-1 and TASK channels). In the case of TREK-1, activation was shown through an anesthetic perturbation to membrane lipid clusters and activation of phospholipase D2; direct binding of anesthetics to purified reconstituted TREK-1 had no effect on conductance. The effects of certain general anesthetics are less pronounced in K_{2P} knock-out mice, as compared to their wild-type counterparts. Cumulatively, TASK-1, TASK-3, and TREK-1 are particularly well supported as playing a role in the induction of general anesthesia.

=== Others ===
- Opioid receptor agonists are primarily utilized for their analgesic effects. These drugs, however, can also elicit sedation. This effect is mediated by opioid actions on both opioid and acetylcholine receptors. While these drugs can lead to decreased arousal, they do not elicit a loss of consciousness. For this reason, they are often used in parallel with other general anesthetics to help maintain a state of general anesthesia. Such drugs include morphine, fentanyl, hydromorphone, and remifentanil.
- Administration of the alpha2 adrenergic receptor agonist dexmedetomidine leads to sedation that resembles non-REM sleep. It is used in parallel with other general anesthetics to help maintain a state of general anesthesia, in an off-label capacity. Notably, patients are easily aroused from this non-REM sleep state.
- Dopamine receptor antagonists have sedative and antiemetic properties. Previously, they were used in parallel with opioids to elicit neuroleptic anesthesia (catalepsy, analgesia, and unresponsiveness). They are no longer used in the context, because patients experiencing neuroleptic anesthesia were frequently aware of the medical procedures being performed, but could not move or express emotion. Such drugs include haloperidol and droperidol.

== Stages of anesthesia ==
During administration of an anesthetic, the receiver goes through different stages of behavior ultimately leading to unconsciousness. This process is accelerated with intravenous anesthetics, so much so that it is negligible to consider during their use. The four stages of anesthesia are described using Guedel's signs, signifying the depth of anesthesia. These stages describe effects of anesthesia mainly on cognition, muscular activity, and respiration.

=== Stage I: Analgesia ===
The receiver of the anesthesia primarily feels analgesia followed by amnesia and a sense of confusion moving into the next stage.

=== Stage II: Excitement ===
Stage II is often characterized by the receiver being delirious and confused, with severe amnesia. Irregularities in the patterns of respiration are common at this stage of anesthesia. Nausea and vomiting are also indicators of Stage II anesthesia. Struggling and panic can sometimes occur as a result of delirium.

=== Stage III: Surgical anesthesia ===
Normal breathing resumes at the beginnings of Stage III. Nearing the end of the stage, breathing ceases completely. Indicators for stage III anesthesia include loss of the eyelash reflex as well as regular breathing. Depth of stage III anesthesia can often be gauged by eye movement and pupil size.

=== Stage IV: Medullary depression ===
No respiration occurs in stage IV. This is shortly followed by circulatory failure and depression of the vasomotor centers. Death is common at this stage of anesthesia if no breathing and circulatory support is available.

== Physiological side effects ==
Aside from the clinically advantageous effects of general anesthetics, there are a number of other physiological consequences mediated by this class of drug. Notably, a reduction in blood pressure can be facilitated by a variety of mechanisms, including reduced cardiac contractility and dilation of the vasculature. This drop in blood pressure may activate a reflexive increases in heart rate, due to a baroreceptor-mediated feedback mechanism. Some anesthetics, however, disrupt this reflex.

Patients under general anesthesia are at greater risk of developing hypothermia, as the aforementioned vasodilation increases the heat lost via peripheral blood flow. By and large, these drugs reduce the internal body temperature threshold at which autonomic thermoregulatory mechanisms are triggered in response to cold. (On the other hand, the threshold at which thermoregulatory mechanisms are triggered in response to heat is typically increased.)

Anesthetics typically affect respiration. Inhalational anesthetics elicit bronchodilation, an increase in respiratory rate, and reduced tidal volume. The net effect is decreased respiration, which must be managed by healthcare providers, while the patient is under general anesthesia. The reflexes that function to alleviate airway obstructions are also dampened (e.g. gag and cough). Compounded with a reduction in lower esophageal sphincter tone, which increases the frequency of regurgitation, patients are especially prone to asphyxiation while under general anesthesia. Healthcare providers closely monitor individuals under general anesthesia and utilize a number of devices, such as an endotracheal tube, to ensure patient safety.

General anesthetics also affect the chemoreceptor trigger zone and brainstem vomiting center, eliciting nausea and vomiting following treatment.

== Pharmacokinetics ==
=== Intravenous general anesthetics ===
==== Induction ====
Intravenously delivered general anesthetics are typically small and highly lipophilic molecules. These characteristics facilitate their rapid preferential distribution into the brain and spinal cord, which are both highly vascularized and lipophilic. It is here where the actions of these drugs lead to general anesthesia induction.

==== Elimination ====
Following distribution into the central nervous system (CNS), the anesthetic drug then diffuses out of the CNS into the muscles and viscera, followed by adipose tissues. In patients given a single injection of drug, this redistribution results in termination of general anesthesia. Therefore, following administration of a single anesthetic bolus, duration of drug effect is dependent solely upon the redistribution kinetics.

The half-life of an anesthetic drug following a prolonged infusion, however, depends upon both drug redistribution kinetics, drug metabolism in the liver, and existing drug concentration in fat. When large quantities of an anesthetic drug have already been dissolved in the body's fat stores, this can slow its redistribution out of the brain and spinal cord, prolonging its CNS effects. For this reason, the half-lives of these infused drugs are said to be context-dependent. Generally, prolonged anesthetic drug infusions result in longer drug half-lives, slowed elimination from the brain and spinal cord, and delayed termination of general anesthesia.

=== Inhalational general anesthetics ===
Minimal alveolar concentration (MAC) is the concentration of an inhalational anesthetic in the lungs that prevents 50% of patients from responding to surgical incision. This value is used to compare the potencies of various inhalational general anesthetics and impacts the partial-pressure of the drug utilized by healthcare providers during general anesthesia induction and/or maintenance.

==== Induction ====
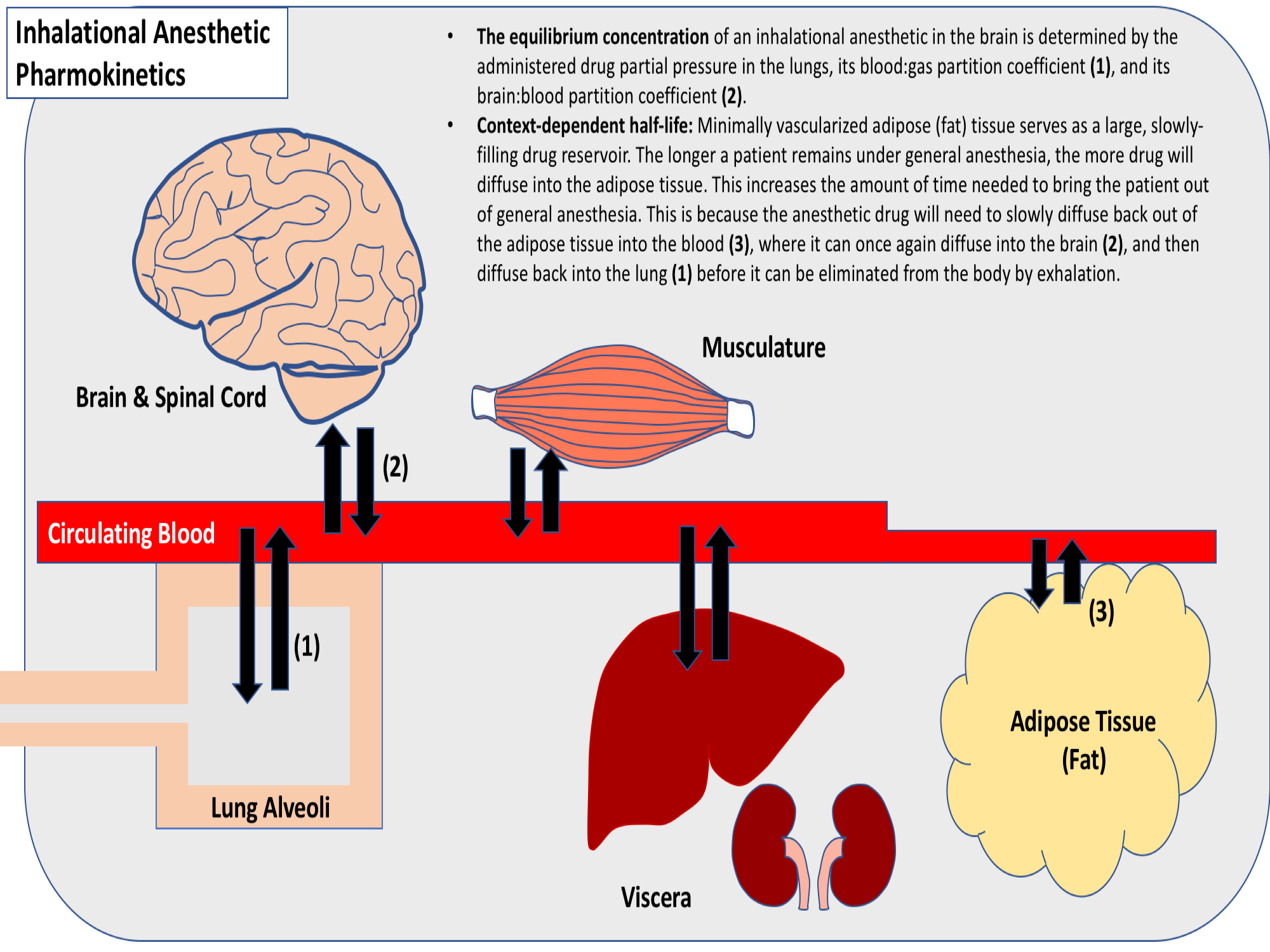

Induction of anesthesia is facilitated by diffusion of an inhaled anesthetic drug into the brain and spinal cord. Diffusion throughout the body proceeds until the drug's partial pressure within the various tissues is equivalent to the partial pressure of the drug within the lungs. Healthcare providers can control the rate of anesthesia induction and final tissue concentrations of the anesthetic by varying the partial pressure of the inspired anesthetic. A higher drug partial pressure in the lungs will drive diffusion more rapidly throughout the body and yield a higher maximum tissue concentration. Respiratory rate and inspiratory volume will also affect the promptness of anesthesia onset, as will the extent of pulmonary blood flow.

The partition coefficient of a gaseous drug is indicative of its relative solubility in various tissues. This metric is the relative drug concentration between two tissues, when their partial pressures are equal (gas:blood, fat:blood, etc.). Inhalational anesthetics vary widely with respect to their tissue solubilities and partition coefficients. Anesthetics that are highly soluble require many molecules of drug to raise the partial pressure within a given tissue, as opposed to minimally soluble anesthetics which require relatively few. Generally, inhalational anesthetics that are minimally soluble reach equilibrium more quickly. Inhalational anesthetics that have a high fat:blood partition coefficient, however, reach equilibrium more slowly, due to the minimal vascularization of fat tissue, which serves as a large, slowly-filling reservoir for the drug.

==== Elimination ====
Inhaled anesthetics are eliminated via expiration, following diffusion into the lungs. This process is dependent largely upon the anesthetic blood:gas partition coefficient, tissue solubility, blood flow to the lungs, and patient respiratory rate and inspiratory volume. For gases that have minimal tissue solubility, termination of anesthesia generally occurs as rapidly as the onset of anesthesia. For gases that have high tissue solubility, however, termination of anesthesia is generally context-dependent. As with intravenous anesthetic infusions, prolonged delivery of highly soluble anesthetic gases generally results in longer drug half-lives, slowed elimination from the brain and spinal cord, and delayed termination of anesthesia.

Metabolism of inhaled anesthetics is generally not a major route of drug elimination.

== History ==
=== Ethanol ===
While most research focuses on the intoxicating effects of ethanol, it can also produce a general anesthesia. Since antiquity, prior to the development of modern agents, alcohol was used as a general anaesthetic.

== See also ==
- Local anaesthesia
- Mechanical ventilation
- Intraoperative awareness
- History of general anesthesia
- Endogenous anesthetic
