= C20H28N2O5 =

The molecular formula C_{20}H_{28}N_{2}O_{5} (molar mass: 376.447 g/mol, exact mass: 376.1998 u) may refer to:

- Enalapril
- Remifentanil
