= Riccardo Saccardi =

Hematologist, clinician-scientist

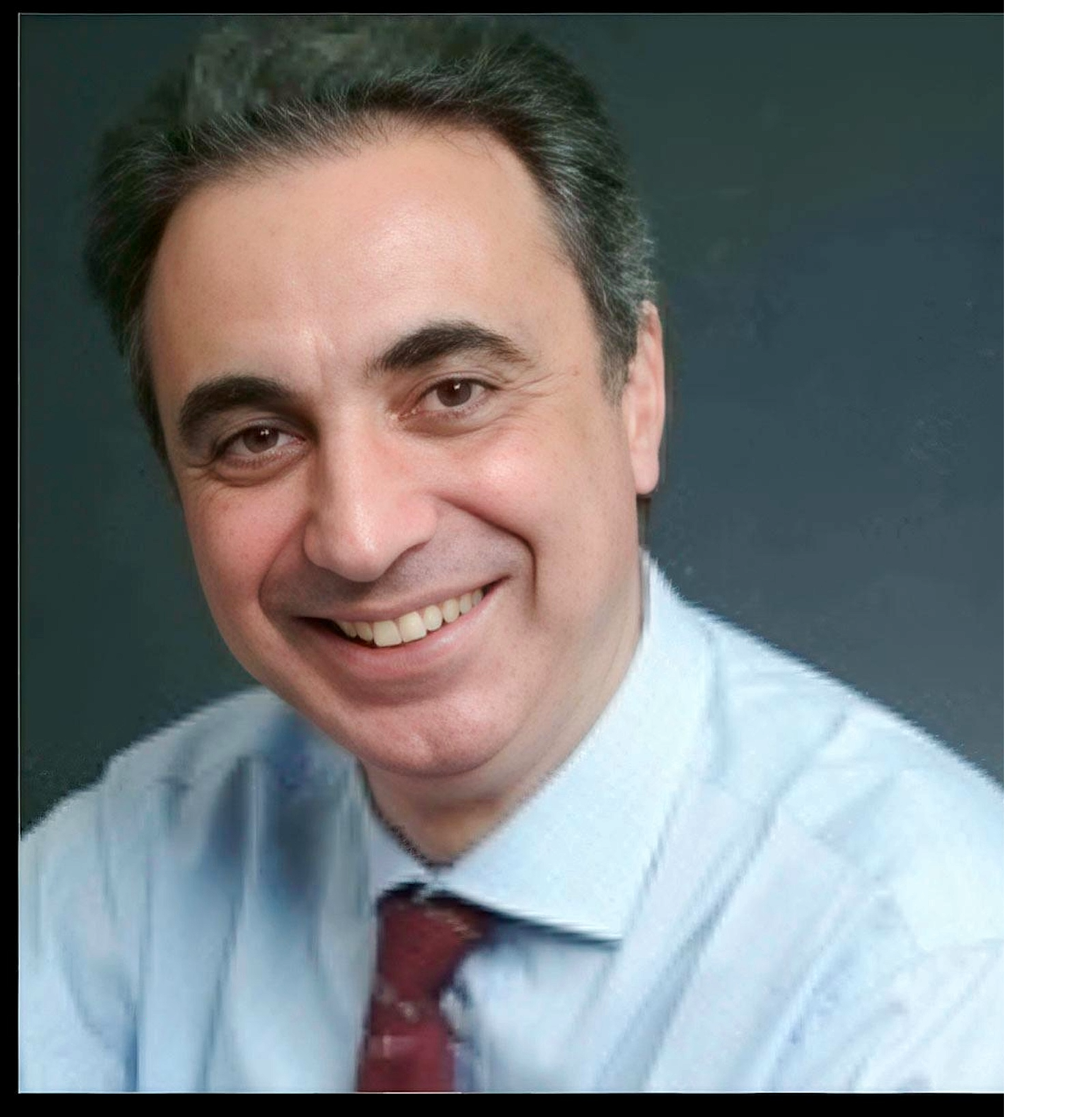
- Born: 20 April 1956; Florence, Italy
- Died: 19 February 2024 (aged 67)
- Education: MD and specialization in Hematology, University of Florence
- Occupations: o Director, SODc Cellular Therapies and Transfusion Medicine o Director, Qualified Center for CAR-T administration o Medical Director, JACIE (European HSCT accreditation) o Chair and senior member, EBMT Autoimmune Diseases Working Party
- Known for: o Development and clinical application of autologous HSCT in multiple sclerosis and other autoimmune diseases o Major contributions to EBMT guidelines and registries on HSCT in autoimmune disorders o Leadership in quality and accreditation (JACIE) of HSCT programs
- Title: Hematologist, clinician-scientist Careggi University Hospital (AOU Careggi), Florence

Riccardo Saccardi (20 April 1956 – 19 February 2024) was an Italian hematologist and clinician-scientist noted for his pioneering work on hematopoietic stem cell transplantation (HSCT) for multiple sclerosis (MS) and other severe autoimmune diseases. Based at Careggi University Hospital in Florence, he helped develop autologous HSCT as a high-efficacy therapy in aggressive multiple sclerosis, contributed to European guidelines and registries, and played a major role in accreditation standards for transplant and cellular therapy programs through the European Society for Blood and Marrow Transplantation (EBMT) and Joint Accreditation Committee of the International society for cell therapy (ISCT) and EBMT (JACIE). He authored more than 230 indexed publications and held senior leadership positions in Italian and European transplant networks.

== Early life and education ==
Saccardi was born in Florence and obtained a classical high school diploma at Liceo Michelangelo in 1974. He graduated in Medicine and Surgery at the University of Florence on 28 October 1981 with highest honors, and specialized in Hematology at the same university in 1984, also with highest marks. He registered with the Italian Medical Board in 1982. He held international training posts as Visiting Scholar at Hôpital Saint Louis in Paris (1987) and Visiting Scientist at Memorial Sloan Kettering Cancer Center in New York (1988).

== Clinical career ==
Saccardi spent virtually his entire clinical career at the Azienda Ospedaliero-Universitaria Careggi in Florence, a major National Health Service hospital and academic center. Between 1990 and 1993, he worked as a Medical Assistant in the Hematology Department, specifically on the transplant ward. From 1994 to 1999, he served as a Level I Medical Director in Hematology with a focus on transplantation. From 1999 onward, he held the position of Level II Senior Medical Director.

He was Medical Head of the Umbilical Cord Blood Bank and the Bone Marrow Transplantation Laboratory from 1996 onward. From 2009 to 2016 he directed the Careggi Umbilical Cord Blood Bank. In 2016 he became Director of the Complex Operative Department (SODc) of Cellular Therapies and Transfusion Medicine, overseeing cord blood banking, clinical bone marrow transplantation, the transplant processing laboratory, the musculoskeletal tissue bank and the transfusion service.

From 2011 to 2012, he coordinated a two-year international project on biobanking and cord blood cell transplantation in collaboration with CNT/CNS (Centro Nazionale Trapianti/Centro Nazionale Sangue), Careggi University Hospital and Eurocord at the Hôpital Saint-Louis in Paris.

In 2019 he was appointed Director of the Qualified Center for CAR-T therapy at Careggi, integrating advanced cellular therapies into clinical practice.

== Research and scientific contributions ==
=== HSCT in multiple sclerosis ===
Saccardi was a central figure in the development of autologous HSCT for MS, in Italy and internationally. Within the Italian GITMO-Neuro Intergroup and the EBMT Autoimmune Diseases Working Party he contributed to early evidence that autologous HSCT can suppress gadolinium-enhancing MRI activity in MS (e.g. Neurology 2001). He led multicenter Italian and EBMT trials evaluating disease activity, disability and quality of life after HSCT in severe progressive or aggressive MS (including the ASTIMS phase II study). He also worked on conditioning regimens of intermediate intensity, showing beneficial risk–benefit profiles and conducted meta-analyses and long-term outcome studies demonstrating that "no evidence of disease activity" (NEDA) and durable stabilization or improvement are more frequently achieved with HSCT than with conventional disease-modifying therapies.

Key publications include original trials, MRI-based follow-up studies, and high-impact reviews and position papers in Lancet Neurology, Nature Reviews Neurology, Neurology and Multiple Sclerosis, some addressing whether HSCT should be considered as a first-line option in highly aggressive MS.

=== HSCT in other autoimmune diseases ===
Beyond MS, Saccardi co-authored foundational EBMT registry analyses and guidelines on HSCT in systemic lupus erythematosus, systemic sclerosis, vasculitis, Crohn's disease, and other autoimmune disorders. His work with EBMT and collaborating societies included summarizing over a decade of experience with autologous HSCT in autoimmune diseases (Haematologica, Bone Marrow Transplant). He also contributed to randomized and non-randomized studies, including research on refractory Crohn's disease (JAMA 2015) and produced recommendations on cardiopulmonary assessment, cardiotoxicity in systemic sclerosis candidates for HSCT, as well as infection prevention and risk management. His contributions also extended to EBMT guidelines and practice harmonization documents developed during the COVID-19 pandemic.

He also participated in studies on allogeneic HSCT for selected autoimmune diseases and in expert-based position statements on innovative cellular therapies for autoimmune disorders (EClinicalMedicine 2024).

=== Regenerative medicine and mesenchymal stem cells ===
Saccardi was involved in preclinical and translational research on bone marrow–derived mesenchymal stem cells (MSC) and regenerative medicine, including experimental use of MSCs for muscle regeneration in sphincter damage models, preclinical models of MSC-mediated tolerance in organ transplantation (pancreatic islets and heart–lung grafts), and engineering of de-epidermized dermis with MSCs for skin regeneration.

He co-authored work showing impaired endothelial differentiation of MSCs and altered paracrine function in systemic sclerosis, elucidating mechanisms underlying vascular damage.

=== Bibliometrics and research output ===
Saccardi co-authored more than 230 indexed publications, mainly on HSCT and cellular therapies in MS and autoimmune diseases, as well as on transplant practice and accreditation in Europe.

== Roles in scientific societies and accreditation ==
Saccardi played important roles in national and international organizations. He was member (2001-2024) and Chair (2004–2010) of the Autoimmune Diseases Working Party of the EBMT. He was also a member of the Italian Group for Bone Marrow Transplantation (GITMO), served as the Italian coordinator of the GITMO-Neuro Intergroup for HSCT in MS from 1998 to 2003, and was a member of its Executive Board from 2017 to 2019. In addition, he served as a JACIE Inspector for both clinical and laboratory sectors from 2004 onward and as medical Director of JACIE from 2016 to 2020, overseeing accreditation processes for HSCT centers across Europe.

He was scientific chair of the EBMT Annual Meeting in Florence (2008) and Chair of the international congress "Hematopoietic Stem Cell Transplantation for Autoimmune Diseases" in Florence (2009). He co-authored chapters on JACIE accreditation in the EBMT Handbook and position statements addressing information for patients, supportive care, and rehabilitation around HSCT.

== Honours and awards ==
- 2011: "Best Abstract Award" in the allogeneic transplantation category at the American Society of Hematology (ASH) annual meeting.
- 2013: "Van Bekkum Award" at the EBMT Annual Meeting, acknowledging significant contributions to HSCT research.

== Legacy ==
Riccardo Saccardi died on 19 February 2024. His work helped establish autologous HSCT as a viable, guideline-supported therapy for aggressive multiple sclerosis and other autoimmune diseases, and shaped standards of quality and accreditation for HSCT and cellular therapy centers. His extensive scientific output, leadership in EBMT and JACIE, and commitment to teaching and mentorship continue to influence clinical practice and research in hematology, neurology and regenerative medicine.

== Personal life ==
Riccardo Saccardi resided in Florence all his life. He was married and had one daughter.

== Selected Bibliography (Representative) ==
=== Multiple Sclerosis and HSCT ===
- Mancardi GL, Saccardi R, et al. Autologous HSCT suppresses gadolinium-enhancing MRI activity in MS. Neurology. 2001.
- Saccardi R, Mancardi GL, et al. Autologous HSCT for severe progressive MS: impact on disease activity and quality of life. Blood. 2005.
- Mancardi GL, Saccardi R. Autologous HSCT in multiple sclerosis. Lancet Neurol. 2008.
- Muraro PA, Pasquini M, Saccardi R, et al. Long-term outcomes after autologous HSCT for MS. JAMA Neurol. 2017.
- Sormani MP, Muraro PA, Saccardi R, Mancardi GL. Meta-analysis of autologous HSCT in MS. Neurology. 2017.
- Muraro PA, Martin R, Mancardi GL, Saccardi R, et al. Autologous HSCT for treatment of MS. Nat Rev Neurol. 2017.
- Boffa G, Saccardi R, et al. Long-term clinical outcomes of HSCT in MS. Neurology. 2021.
- Mariottini A, Saccardi R, et al. Intermediate-intensity HSCT reduces neurofilament light chains and brain atrophy in aggressive MS. Front Neurol. 2022.
- Mariottini A, Muraro PA, Saccardi R. Should HSCT be offered as first-line DMT in MS? Mult Scler Relat Disord. 2023.
- Muraro, P. A., Mariottini A. et al. Autologous haematopoietic stem cell transplantation for treatment of multiple sclerosis and neuromyelitis optica spectrum disorder — recommendations from ECTRIMS and the EBMT. Nature Reviews Neurology, doi:10.1038/s41582-024-01050-x (2025).

=== Autoimmune Diseases and HSCT / Cellular Therapy ===
- Gratwohl A, Tyndall A, Saccardi R, et al. Autologous HSCT for autoimmune diseases: EBMT experience. Bone Marrow Transplant and Haematologica. 2005-2010.
- Farge D, Labopin M, Tyndall A, Saccardi R, et al. Observational study on HSCT for autoimmune diseases: 12 years of EBMT experience. Haematologica. 2010.
- Snowden JA, Saccardi R, et al. Updated EBMT guidelines for HSCT in severe autoimmune diseases. Bone Marrow Transplant. 2012 and 2020.
- Hawkey CJ, Saccardi R, et al. Autologous HSCT for refractory Crohn's disease: randomized clinical trial. JAMA. 2015.
- Greco R, Saccardi R, et al. Allogeneic HSCT for autoimmune diseases: EBMT retrospective study. Front Immunol. 2019
- Farge D, Snowden JA, Saccardi R, et al. Cardiopulmonary assessment and recommendations for HSCT in systemic sclerosis. Bone Marrow Transplant. 2017
- Greco R, Alexander T, Saccardi R, et al. HSCT for autoimmune diseases in the time of COVID-19: EBMT guidelines. Bone Marrow Transplant. 2021.
- Greco R, Saccardi R, et al. Innovative cellular therapies for autoimmune diseases: EBMT practice harmonization and guidelines. EClinicalMedicine. 2024.
