= C3H5O3 =

The molecular formula C_{3}H_{5}O_{3} (molar mass: 89.07 g/mol) may refer to:

- Etabonate group : CH_{3}-CH_{2}-O-CO-O-
- Lactate anion, found in salts and solutions of lactic acid
