= Budiodarone =

Chemical compound

Clinical data
- ATC code: None

Legal status
- Legal status: US: Investigational New Drug

Identifiers
- IUPAC name: [(2S)-butan-2-yl] 2-[3-[4-[2-(diethylamino)ethoxy]-3,5-diiodobenzoyl]-1-benzofuran-2-yl]acetate
- CAS Number: 335148-45-3
- PubChem CID: 9833332
- ChemSpider: 8009056
- UNII: F5Y53150C8
- ChEMBL: ChEMBL2105631

Chemical and physical data
- Formula: C_{27}H_{31}I_{2}NO_{5}
- Molar mass: 703.356 g·mol^{−1}
- 3D model (JSmol): Interactive image
- SMILES: Ic1cc(cc(I)c1OCCN(CC)CC)C(=O)c2c3ccccc3oc2CC(=O)O[C@@H](C)CC
- InChI: InChI=1S/C27H31I2NO5/c1-5-17(4)34-24(31)16-23-25(19-10-8-9-11-22(19)35-23)26(32)18-14-20(28)27(21(29)15-18)33-13-12-30(6-2)7-3/h8-11,14-15,17H,5-7,12-13,16H2,1-4H3/t17-/m0/s1; Key:ZXOSVKYCXLTVGS-KRWDZBQOSA-N

Budiodarone (ATI-2042) is an antiarrhythmic agent and chemical analog of amiodarone that is currently being studied in clinical trials. Amiodarone is considered the most effective antiarrhythmic drug available, but its adverse side effects, including hepatic, pulmonary and thyroid toxicity as well as multiple drug interactions, are discouraging its use. Budiodarone only differs in structure from amiodarone through the presence of a sec-butyl acetate side chain at position 2 of the benzofuran moiety. This side chain allows for budiodarone to have a shorter half-life in the body than amiodarone (7 hours versus 35–68 days) which allows it to have a faster onset of action and metabolism while still maintaining similar electrophysiological activity. The faster metabolism of budiodarone allows for fewer adverse side effects than amiodarone principally due to decreased levels of toxicity in the body.

== Creation of arrhythmias ==
Arrhythmias may be caused by changes in ion channel mRNA and protein expression which modify action potential generation through dysfunctional channels and increase the likelihood of inappropriate electrical re-entry (electrical stimulus entering back into the cell to prematurely start the next action potential). The increase in electrical re-entry causes the fibrillation or uncontrolled action potential discord of atrial myocytes. Arrhythmias have historically been treated using atrial ablation or antiarrhythmic drugs to decrease electrical re-entry and therefore fibrillation.

== Treatment of arrhythmias ==
Budiodarone holds much promise as an antiarrhythmic drug to prevent fibrillation. As a drug that spans over many of antiarrhythmic drug classes, the electrophysiological activity of budiodarone includes:

=== Inhibition of potassium, sodium and calcium channels ===
Through inhibiting potassium channels, budiodarone causes a decreased efflux of potassium out of the myocyte during the refractory period of its action potential, increasing the time it takes to reach the resting membrane potential.

Through blocking sodium channels, budiodarone causes a decrease in sodium influx into myocytes during the depolarization period of its action potential.

Through blocking calcium channels, budiodarone causes a decrease in calcium influx into myocytes, decreasing intracellular calcium and decreasing cardiac contractility, which is beneficial in preventing arrhythmias, but detrimental in ventricular contraction.

=== Increase in atrial myocyte refractory period ===
Through prolonging the refractory and depolarization periods of the action potential, there is a decreased likelihood that electrical re-entry will occur.

=== Increased stimulus-to-atrium and atrium-to-bundle of his intervals ===
Increasing the time interval between stimulus to atrium and/or atrium to bundle of his in action potential conduction slows the rate of myocyte contraction, thereby slowing heart rate.

=== Increased MAPD90 and QT-intervals ===
Increasing the time interval of MAPD90 (response of monophasic action potential duration at 90% repolarization)in action potential conduction, slowing the rate of myocyte contraction, thereby slowing heart rate.

=== Dose-dependent decrease in heart rate ===
A decrease in heart rate reduces the risk of atrial fibrillation.

== Clinical trials ==
Preliminary trials of budiodarone have administered the drug orally as a tartrate salt in amounts ranging from 200 to 800 mg bid. Evidence has shown that 400–600 mg bid doses were associated with the highest reduction in atrial fibrillation burden (54.4% and 75% respectively) while remaining free of the adverse side effects common with amiodarone. In addition to reductions in atrial fibrillation burden, similar dose-dependent reductions in the number of atrial fibrillation episodes and the duration of atrial fibrillation episodes have been demonstrated.

There has also been evidence of prolonged budiodarone cardiac effect days after drug discontinuation as the atrial fibrillation baseline measurements were not reached in washout periods. This suggests that budiodarone may promote atrial re-modelling to improve malfunctioning ion channels that once potentiated fibrillation.

== Future use ==
Data on the effects of long-term budiodarone are not yet available. The completion of current clinical trials will examine chronic budiodarone use to confirm or deny its use as an effective and safe antiarrhythmic drug.

== See also ==
- Amiodarone
- Benzbromarone
- Benziodarone
- Celivarone
- Dronedarone
