= Asengeprast =

Chemical compound

- Chemical structure of asengeprast (FT011)

Clinical data
- Other names: FT011

Identifiers
- IUPAC name: 2-[[(E)-3-(3-methoxy-4-prop-2-ynoxyphenyl)prop-2-enoyl]amino]benzoic acid
- CAS Number: 1001288-58-9
- PubChem CID: 23648966
- ChemSpider: 24664633
- UNII: C6V7ZU2NPR
- ChEMBL: ChEMBL1075834

Chemical and physical data
- Formula: C_{20}H_{17}NO_{5}
- Molar mass: 351.358 g·mol^{−1}
- 3D model (JSmol): Interactive image
- SMILES: COC1=C(C=CC(=C1)/C=C/C(=O)NC2=CC=CC=C2C(=O)O)OCC#C
- InChI: InChI=InChI=1S/C20H17NO5/c1-3-12-26-17-10-8-14(13-18(17)25-2)9-11-19(22)21-16-7-5-4-6-15(16)20(23)24/h1,4-11,13H,12H2,2H3,(H,21,22)(H,23,24)/b11-9+; Key:UIWZIDIJCUEOMT-PKNBQFBNSA-N

Asengeprast (development code FT011) is an experimental scleroderma drug candidate. It is a small molecule inhibitor of the G-protein coupled receptor GPR68 with antifibrotic activity. It is being developed by Certa Therapeutics.

The European Medicines Agency (EMA) and the U.S. Food and Drug Administration (FDA) has granted orphan drug status to FT011, for systemic sclerosis (SSc).

Asengeprast has been reported to attenuate fibrosis and chronic heart failure in experimental diabetic cardiomyopathy. Asengeprast can also inhibit kidney fibrosis and prevent kidney failure. It was developed by structure-activity optimization of the antifibrotic activity of cinnamoyl anthranilates, by assessment of their ability to prevent TGF-beta-stimulated production of collagen.

== See also ==
- Tranilast
