= Loteprednol =

Pharmaceutical drug

Loteprednol etabonate

Clinical data
- Trade names: Lotemax
- Other names: 11β,17α,Dihydroxy-21-oxa-21-chloromethylpregna-1,4-diene-3,20-dione 17α-ethylcarbonate
- AHFS/Drugs.com: Micromedex Detailed Consumer Information
- Routes of administration: Eye drops
- Drug class: Corticosteroid; glucocorticoid
- ATC code: S01BA14 (WHO)

Legal status
- Legal status: AU: S4 (Prescription only); US: ℞-only

Pharmacokinetic data
- Bioavailability: None
- Protein binding: 95%
- Metabolism: Ester hydrolysis
- Metabolites: Δ^{1}-cortienic acid and its etabonate
- Onset of action: ≤2 hrs (allergic conjunctivitis)
- Elimination half-life: 2.8 hrs

Identifiers
- IUPAC name: Chloromethyl 17-ethoxycarbonyloxy-11-hydroxy-10,13-dimethyl-3-oxo-7,8,9,11,12,14,15,16-octahydro-6H-cyclopenta[a]phenanthrene-17-carboxylate
- CAS Number: 82034-46-6
- PubChem CID: 444025
- IUPHAR/BPS: 7085
- DrugBank: DB14596
- ChemSpider: 392049
- UNII: YEH1EZ96K6
- KEGG: D01689
- ChEBI: CHEBI:31784
- ChEMBL: ChEMBL1200865
- CompTox Dashboard (EPA): DTXSID10156128

Chemical and physical data
- Formula: C_{24}H_{31}ClO_{7}
- Molar mass: 466.96 g·mol^{−1}
- 3D model (JSmol): Interactive image
- Melting point: 220.5 to 223.5 °C (428.9 to 434.3 °F)
- Solubility in water: 0.0005 mg/mL (20 °C)
- SMILES: CCOC(=O)O[C@@]1(CC[C@@H]2[C@@]1(C[C@@H]([C@H]3[C@H]2CCC4=CC(=O)C=C[C@]34C)O)C)C(=O)OCCl
- InChI: InChI=1S/C24H31ClO7/c1-4-30-21(29)32-24(20(28)31-13-25)10-8-17-16-6-5-14-11-15(26)7-9-22(14,2)19(16)18(27)12-23(17,24)3/h7,9,11,16-19,27H,4-6,8,10,12-13H2,1-3H3/t16-,17-,18-,19+,22-,23-,24-/m0/s1; Key:DMKSVUSAATWOCU-HROMYWEYSA-N

Loteprednol (formulated as the ester loteprednol etabonate) is a topical corticosteroid used to treat inflammations of the eye. It is marketed by Bausch and Lomb as Lotemax and Loterex.

It was patented in 1980 and approved for medical use in 1998. It is available as a generic medication.

== Medical uses ==
Applications for this drug include the reduction of inflammation after eye surgery, seasonal allergic conjunctivitis, uveitis, and chronic forms of keratitis - such as adenoviral, Thygeson's keratitis, vernal keratoconjunctivitis, pingueculitis, giant papillary conjunctivitis, and episcleritis.

== Contraindications ==
Contraindications: As corticosteroids are immunosuppressive, loteprednol is contraindicated in patients with viral, fungal or mycobacterial infections of the eye.

== Adverse effects ==
The most common adverse effects in patients being treated with the gel formulation are anterior chamber inflammation (in 5% of people), eye pain (2%), and foreign body sensation (2%).

== Interactions ==
Because long term use (more than 10 days) can cause increased intraocular pressure, loteprednol may interfere with the treatment of glaucoma. Following ocular administration, the drug is very slowly absorbed into the blood, therefore the blood level is limited to an extremely small concentration, and interactions with drugs taken by mouth or through any route other than topical ophthalmic are very unlikely.

== Pharmacology ==
=== Mechanism of action ===
Corticosteroids mediate their anti-inflammatory effects mainly through the modulation of the cytosolic glucocorticoid receptor (GR) at the genomic level. Preclinical studies demonstrated that loteprednol etabonate is highly lipophilic and has strong binding affinity to glucocorticoid receptors. After it binds to the GR in the cytoplasm, the activated corticosteroid-GR complex migrates to the nucleus, where it upregulates the expression of anti-inflammatory proteins and represses the expression of proinflammatory proteins. Corticosteroids inhibit inflammatory cytokines, chemokines, adhesion molecules, and other inflammatory mediators. They also reduce synthesis of histamine, stabilize cell membranes, and inhibit degranulation of mast cells. Recent work suggests that the activated corticosteroid-GR complex also elicits nongenomic effects, particularly the inhibition of vasodilation, vascular permeability, and migration of leukocytes.

=== Pharmacokinetics ===
Neither loteprednol etabonate nor its inactive metabolites Δ^{1}-cortienic acid and Δ^{1}-cortienic acid etabonate are detectable in the bloodstream, even after oral administration. A study with patients receiving loteprednol eye drops over 42 days showed no adrenal suppression, which would be a sign of the drug reaching the bloodstream to a clinically relevant extent.

Steroid receptor affinity was 4.3 times that of dexamethasone in animal studies.

=== Retrometabolic drug design ===
Loteprednol etabonate was developed using retrometabolic drug design. It is a so-called soft drug, meaning its structure was designed so that it is predictably metabolised to inactive substances. These metabolites, Δ^{1}-cortienic acid and its etabonate, are derivatives of cortienic acid, itself an inactive metabolite of hydrocortisone.

Cortisol, a naturally occurring corticosteroid, known as hydrocortisone when used as a drug

Δ^{1}-Cortienic acid, inactive metabolite of loteprednol

Cortienic acid, inactive metabolite of hydrocortisone

== Chemistry ==
Loteprednol etabonate is an ester of loteprednol with etabonate (ethyl carbonate). The pure chemical compound has a melting point between 220.5 °C (428.9 °F) and 223.5 °C (434.3 °F). Its solubility in water is 1:2,000,000, therefore it is formulated for ophthalmic use as either an ointment, a gel, or a suspension.

Loteprednol is a corticosteroid. The ketone side chain of classical corticosteroids such as hydrocortisone is replaced by a cleavable ester, which accounts for the rapid inactivation. (This is not the same as the etabonate ester.)

Hydrocortisone

Loteprednol etabonate

=== Chemical synthesis ===
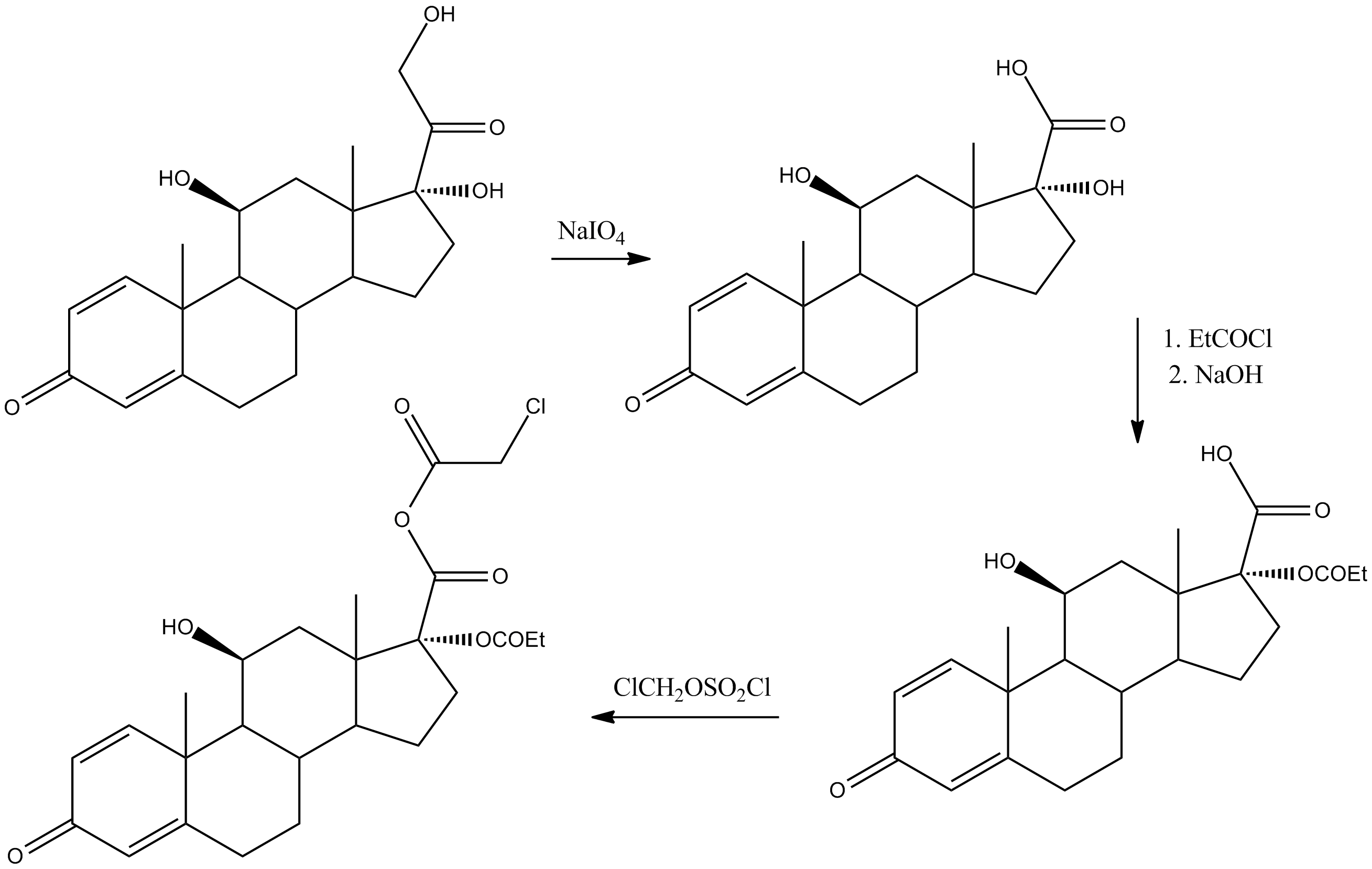
