= Remogliflozin etabonate =

Chemical compound

Clinical data
- Routes of administration: By mouth
- ATC code: none

Legal status
- Legal status: Investigational

Pharmacokinetic data
- Metabolism: Remoglifozin is metabolized primarily by cytochrome P450 (CYP) 3A4 and to a lesser extent by CYP2C19 to GSK 279782 (the active metabolite) and GSK 333081 before being glucuronidated to generate inactive glucuronide conjugates.

Identifiers
- IUPAC name: 5-Methyl-4-[4-(1-methylethoxy)benzyl]-1-(1-methylethyl)-1H-pyrazol-3-yl 6-O-(ethoxycarbonyl)-β-D-glucopyranoside
- CAS Number: 442201-24-3
- ChemSpider: 8047110
- UNII: TR0QT6QSUL
- KEGG: D10055
- ChEMBL: ChEMBL494323
- CompTox Dashboard (EPA): DTXSID50963191

Chemical and physical data
- Formula: C_{26}H_{38}N_{2}O_{9}
- Molar mass: 522.595 g·mol^{−1}
- 3D model (JSmol): Interactive image
- SMILES: OC1C(COC(=O)OCC)OC(C(O)C1O)Oc(nn(C(C)C)c2C)c2Cc3ccc(cc3)OC(C)C
- InChI: InChI=1S/C26H38N2O9/c1-7-33-26(32)34-13-20-21(29)22(30)23(31)25(36-20)37-24-19(16(6)28(27-24)14(2)3)12-17-8-10-18(11-9-17)35-15(4)5/h8-11,14-15,20-23,25,29-31H,7,12-13H2,1-6H3/t20-,21-,22+,23-,25+/m1/s1; Key:UAOCLDQAQNNEAX-ABMICEGHSA-N

Remogliflozin etabonate (INN/USAN) is a drug of the gliflozin class for the treatment of non-alcoholic steatohepatitis ("NASH") and type 2 diabetes. Remogliflozin was discovered by the Japanese company Kissei Pharmaceutical and is currently being developed by BHV Pharma, a wholly owned subsidiary of North Carolina, US-based Avolynt, and Glenmark Pharmaceuticals through a collaboration with BHV. In 2002, GlaxoSmithKline (GSK) received a license to use it. From 2002 to 2009, GSK carried out a significant clinical development program for the treatment of type-2 diabetes mellitus in various nations across the world and obesity in the UK. Remogliflozin etabonate's pharmacokinetics, pharmacodynamics, and clinical dose regimens were characterized in 18 Phase I and 2 Phase II investigations. Due to financial concerns, GSK stopped working on remogliflozin and sergliflozin, two further SGLT2 inhibitors that were licensed to the company, in 2009. Remogliflozin was commercially launched first in India by Glenmark in May 2019.

== Clinical trials ==
Remogliflozin etabonate was shown to enhance urinary glucose excretion in rodents and humans. Early studies in diabetics improved plasma glucose levels. Remogliflozin etabonate has been studied at doses up to 1000 mg. A pair of 12-week phase 2b randomized clinical trials of diabetics published in 2015, found reductions in glycated hemoglobin and that it was generally well tolerated. In a meta-analysis published by Dutta et al. involving data from 3 randomized controlled trials (535 patients), remogliflozin was noted to have similar glycaemic efficacy (reduction in HbA1c and fasting glucose) as compared to dapagliflozin and pioglitazone. A study concluded that concomitant administration of remogliflozin etabonate, either 500 mg or 750 mg BID (twice a day), with metformin 2000 mg BID was safe and effective in patients with type 2 diabetes mellitus during the observation period.

== Method of action ==
Remogliflozin etabonate is a pro-drug of remogliflozin. Remogliflozin inhibits the sodium-glucose transport proteins (SGLT), which are responsible for glucose reabsorption in the kidney. Blocking this transporter causes blood glucose to be eliminated through the urine. Remogliflozin is selective for SGLT2.

== See also ==
- Etabonate
