= Kissei =

Kissei Pharmaceutical
- ISIN: JP3240600001
- Industry: Pharmaceutical products, therapeutic and care foods
- Founded: August 9, 1946; 79 years ago
- Headquarters: Matsumoto, Nagano, Japan
- Key people: Mutsuo Kanzawa (CEO)
- Number of employees: 1504
- Website: www.kissei.co.jp/e_contents/

Kissei Pharmaceutical is a pharmaceutical company based in Matsumoto, Nagano, Japan. Products discovered or developed by Kissei include:

- Difelikefalin
- Fostamatinib (trade name Tavalisse)
- Linzagolix
- Mitiglinide (Glufast)
- Remogliflozin etabonate
- Silodosin (Urief)
- Tranilast (Rizaben)

In March 2020, Kissei and CG Oncology, Inc. announced an exclusive license, development, and commercialization agreement for CG's oncolytic immunotherapy drug CG0070. The agreement covered Japan, South Korea, Taiwan, and other Asian countries, but not China.
