= Celivarone =

Experimental drug being tested for use in pharmacological antiarrhythmic therapy

- Skeletal structure of celivarone

- Ball-and-stick model of celivarone

Names
- Preferred IUPAC name Propan-2-yl 2-butyl-3-{4-[3-(dibutylamino)propyl]benzoyl}-1-benzofuran-5-carboxylate
- Other names SSR149744C

Identifiers
| CAS Number | 401925-43-7 |
| 3D model (JSmol) | Interactive image |
| ChemSpider | 7982887 |
| ECHA InfoCard | 100.211.855 |
| PubChem CID | 9807128 |
| UNII | K45001587E |
| CompTox Dashboard (EPA) | DTXSID50960620 |
- InChI: InChI=1S/C34H47NO4/c1-6-9-14-31-32(29-24-28(19-20-30(29)39-31)34(37)38-25(4)5)33(36)27-17-15-26(16-18-27)13-12-23-35(21-10-7-2)22-11-8-3/h15-20,24-25H,6-14,21-23H2,1-5H3 Key: ZCENNVQCOZQSGH-UHFFFAOYSA-N; InChI=1/C34H47NO4/c1-6-9-14-31-32(29-24-28(19-20-30(29)39-31)34(37)38-25(4)5)33(36)27-17-15-26(16-18-27)13-12-23-35(21-10-7-2)22-11-8-3/h15-20,24-25H,6-14,21-23H2,1-5H3 Key: ZCENNVQCOZQSGH-UHFFFAOYAX
- SMILES: O=C(OC(C)C)c3cc1c(oc(c1C(=O)c2ccc(cc2)CCCN(CCCC)CCCC)CCCC)cc3

Properties
| Chemical formula | C_{34}H_{47}NO_{4} |
| Molar mass | 533.753 g·mol^{−1} |
- Except where otherwise noted, data are given for materials in their standard state (at 25 °C [77 °F], 100 kPa). verify (what is ?) Infobox references

Celivarone is an experimental drug being tested for use in pharmacological antiarrhythmic therapy. Cardiac arrhythmia is any abnormality in the electrical activity of the heart. Arrhythmias range from mild to severe, sometimes causing symptoms like palpitations, dizziness, fainting, and even death. They can manifest as slow (bradycardia) or fast (tachycardia) heart rate, and may have a regular or irregular rhythm.

== Molecular causes of cardiac arrhythmias ==
The causes of cardiac arrhythmias are numerous, from structural changes in the conduction system (the sinoatrial and atrioventricular nodes, or His-Purkinje system) and cardiac muscle, to mutations in genes coding for ion channels of the heart. Movement of ions, particularly Na^{+}, Ca^{2+} and K^{+}, causes depolarizations of cell membranes in node cells, which are then transmitted to cardiac muscle cells to induce contraction. After depolarization, the ions are moved back to their original locations, leading to repolarization of the membrane and relaxation. Disruptions in ion flow affect the heart's ability to contract by altering the resting membrane potential, affecting the cell's ability to conduct or transmit an action potential (AP), or by affecting the rate or force of contraction.

The specific molecular changes involved in arrhythmias depend on the nature of the problem. Ion channel mutations can alter protein conformation, and so change the amount of current flowing through these channels. Due to changes in amino acids and binding domains, mutations may also affect the ability of these channels to respond to physiological changes in cardiac demand. Mutations resulting in loss of function of K^{+} channels can result in delayed repolarization of the cardiac muscle cells. Similarly, gain of function of Na^{+} and Ca^{2+} channels results in delayed repolarization, and Ca^{2+} overload causing increased Ca^{2+} binding to cardiac troponin C, more actin-myosin interactions and causing an increased contractility, respectively. Mutations cause many arrhythmic conditions, including atrial fibrillation (AF), atrial flutter (AFl), and ventricular fibrillation (V-Fib). Arrhythmias can also be induced by altered activity of the vagus nerve and activation of β_{1} adrenergic receptors.

== Mechanism of action ==
Celivarone is a non-iodinated benzofuran derivative, structurally related to amiodarone, a drug commonly used to treat arrhythmias. Celivarone has potential as an antiarrhythmic agent, attributable to its multifactorial mechanism of action; blocking Na^{+}, L-type Ca^{2+} and many types of K^{+} channels (I_{Kr}, I_{Ks}, I_{KACh} and IK_{v}1.5), as well as inhibiting β_{1} receptors, all in dose-dependent manners. The mechanisms by which celivarone modifies ion flow through these channels is unknown, but hearts demonstrate longer PQ intervals and decreased cell shortening, indicative of blocked L-type Ca^{2+} channels, depressed maximum current with each action potential with no change in the resting membrane potential, caused by blocked Na^{+} channels, and longer action potential duration due to K^{+} channel blocks. Celivarone is therefore described as having class I, II, III, and IV antiarrhythmic properties.

== Indications for use ==
Celivarone displays some atrial selectivity, suggesting it may be most effective at targeting atrial arrhythmias like atrial fibrillation and atrial flutter. These conditions are characterized by rapid atrial rates, 400–600 bpm for atrial fibrillation and 150–300 bpm for atrial flutter. Studies have shown celivarone is capable of cardioversion, maintaining normal sinus cardiac rhythms, being effective in hypokalemic, vasotonic, and stretch-induced atrial fibrillation, as well as ischemic and reperfusion ventricular fibrillation. Since it affects multiple ion channels, it also shows promise in treating genetic forms of arrhythmia caused by several ion channel mutations.

== Future research ==
Celivarone may be an effective antihypertensive therapy, as it inhibits both angiotensin II and phenylephrine induced hypertension in dogs, despite having no affinity for these receptors. Atrial fibrillation is especially common in hypertensive adults so a single drug to combat both problems is desirable. The non-iodinated nature of celivarone means that the harmful side-effects on the thyroid commonly seen with amiodarone therapy are eliminated, making the drug an attractive alternative. Higher oral bioavailability, shorter duration of action, and lower accumulation in body tissues are also benefits of celivarone. Presently, two studies are underway to determine if the effects observed in the animal models are reproducible in a human population.

== See also ==
- Amiodarone
- Benzbromarone
- Benziodarone
- Budiodarone
- Dronedarone
