= Sergliflozin etabonate =

Chemical compound

Clinical data
- Routes of administration: Oral
- ATC code: none

Identifiers
- IUPAC name: 2-(4-methoxybenzyl)phenyl 6-O-(ethoxycarbonyl)-β-D-glucopyranoside
- CAS Number: 408504-26-7
- PubChem CID: 9824918
- IUPHAR/BPS: 4587
- ChemSpider: 21234810
- UNII: 4HY3523466
- ChEMBL: ChEMBL450044
- CompTox Dashboard (EPA): DTXSID20961265

Chemical and physical data
- Formula: C_{23}H_{28}O_{9}
- Molar mass: 448.468 g·mol^{−1}
- 3D model (JSmol): Interactive image
- SMILES: CCOC(=O)OCC1C(C(C(C(O1)Oc2ccccc2Cc3ccc(cc3)OC)O)O)O
- InChI: InChI=1S/C23H28O9/c1-3-29-23(27)30-13-18-19(24)20(25)21(26)22(32-18)31-17-7-5-4-6-15(17)12-14-8-10-16(28-2)11-9-14/h4-11,18-22,24-26H,3,12-13H2,1-2H3; Key:QLXKHBNJTPICNF-UHFFFAOYSA-N

Sergliflozin etabonate (INN/USAN, codenamed GW869682X) is an investigational anti-diabetic drug being developed by GlaxoSmithKline. It did not undergo further development after phase II.

== Method of action ==
Sergliflozin inhibits subtype 2 of the sodium-glucose transport proteins (SGLT2), which is responsible for at least 90% of the glucose reabsorption in the kidney. Blocking this transporter causes blood glucose to be eliminated through the urine.

== Chemistry ==
Etabonate refers to the ethyl carbonate group. The remaining structure, which is the active substance, is called sergliflozin.

Sergliflozin
