= Systemic scleroderma =

Accumulation of collagen in the skin and internal organs

- Other names: Diffuse scleroderma, systemic sclerosis, Curzio's syndrome
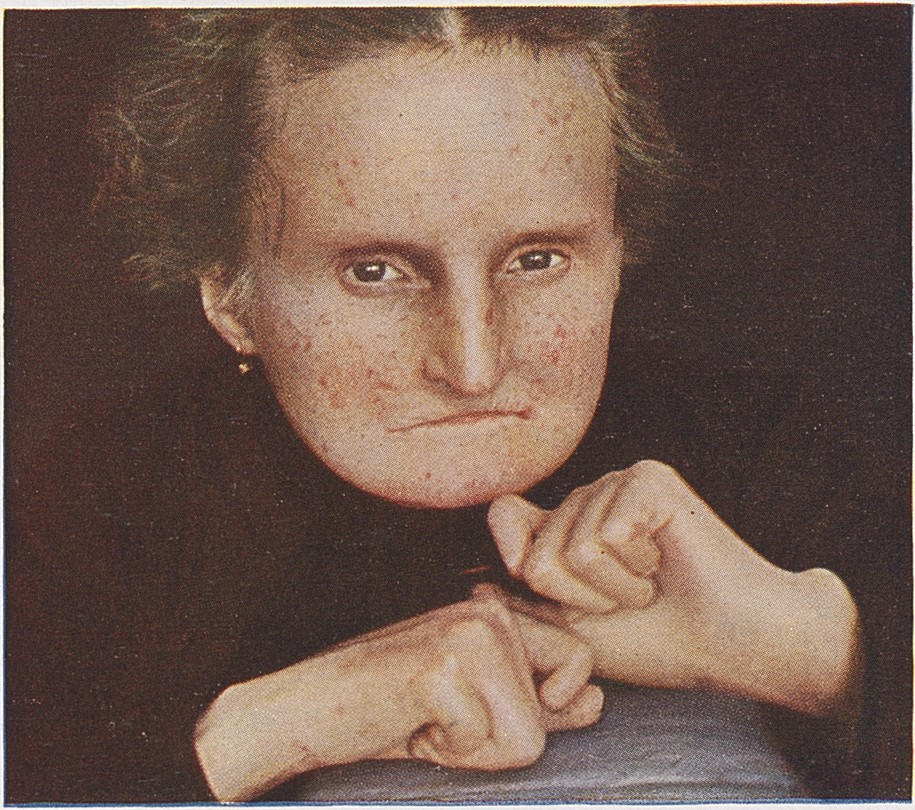
- Patient with systemic scleroderma
- Specialty: Rheumatology
- Frequency: 0.03%

Systemic scleroderma, or systemic sclerosis, is an autoimmune rheumatic disease characterised by excessive production and accumulation of collagen, called fibrosis, in the skin and internal organs and by injuries to small arteries. There are two major subgroups of systemic sclerosis based on the extent of skin involvement: limited and diffuse. The limited form affects areas below, but not above, the elbows and knees with or without involvement of the face. The diffuse form also affects the skin above the elbows and knees and can also spread to the torso. Visceral organs, including the kidneys, heart, lungs, and gastrointestinal tract can also be affected by the fibrotic process. Prognosis is determined by the form of the disease and the extent of visceral involvement. Patients with limited systemic sclerosis have a better prognosis than those with the diffuse form. Death is most often caused by lung, heart, and kidney involvement. The risk of cancer is increased slightly.

Survival rates have greatly increased with effective treatment for kidney failure. Therapies include immunosuppressive drugs, and in some cases, glucocorticoids.

== Signs and symptoms ==
Calcinosis, Raynaud's phenomenon, Esophageal dysfunction, Sclerodactyly, and Telangiectasia (CREST syndrome) are associated with limited scleroderma. Other symptoms include:

=== Skin symptoms ===
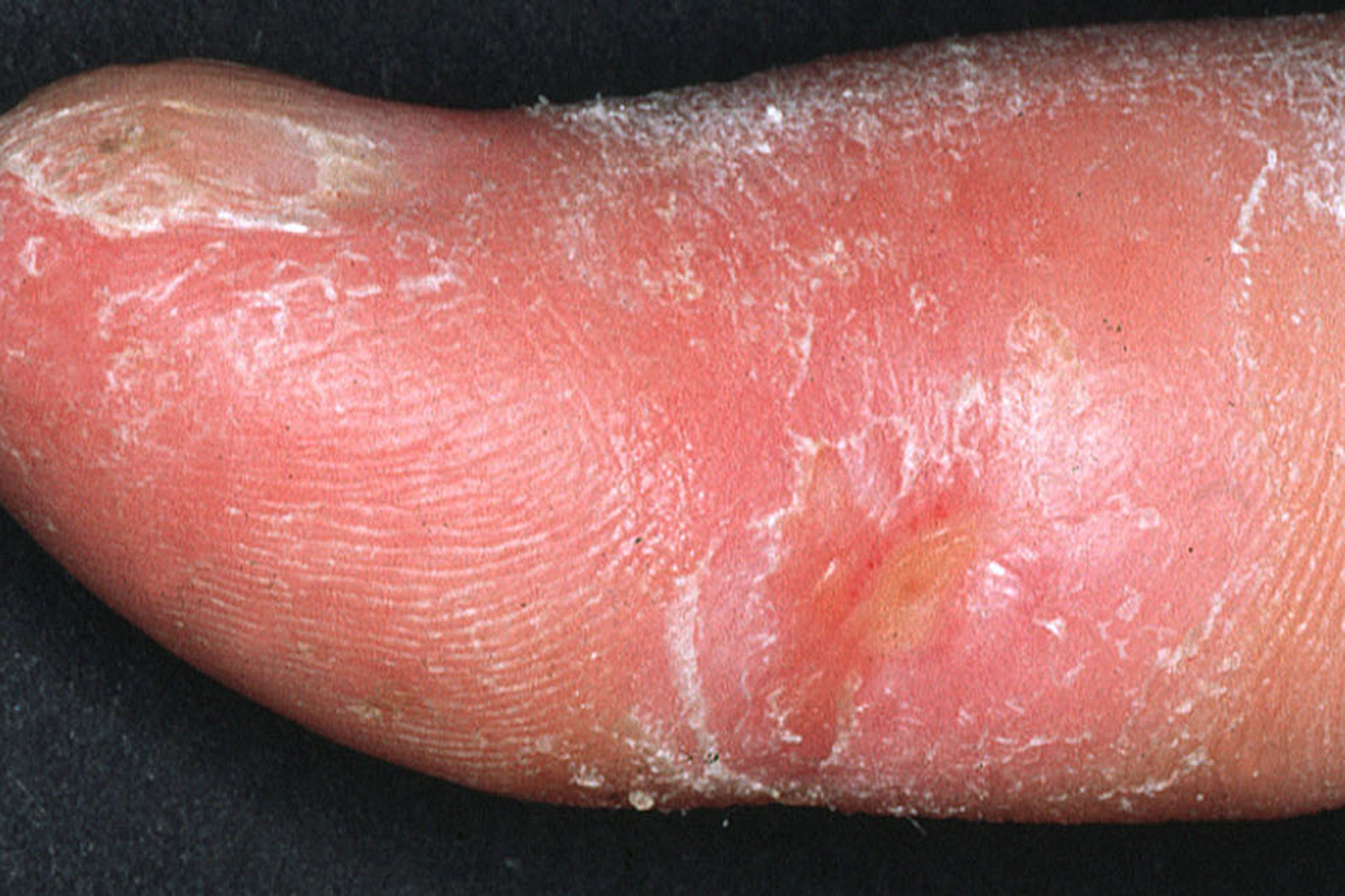
Clinical appearance of acrosclerotic piece-meal necrosis of the thumb in a patient with systemic sclerosis.

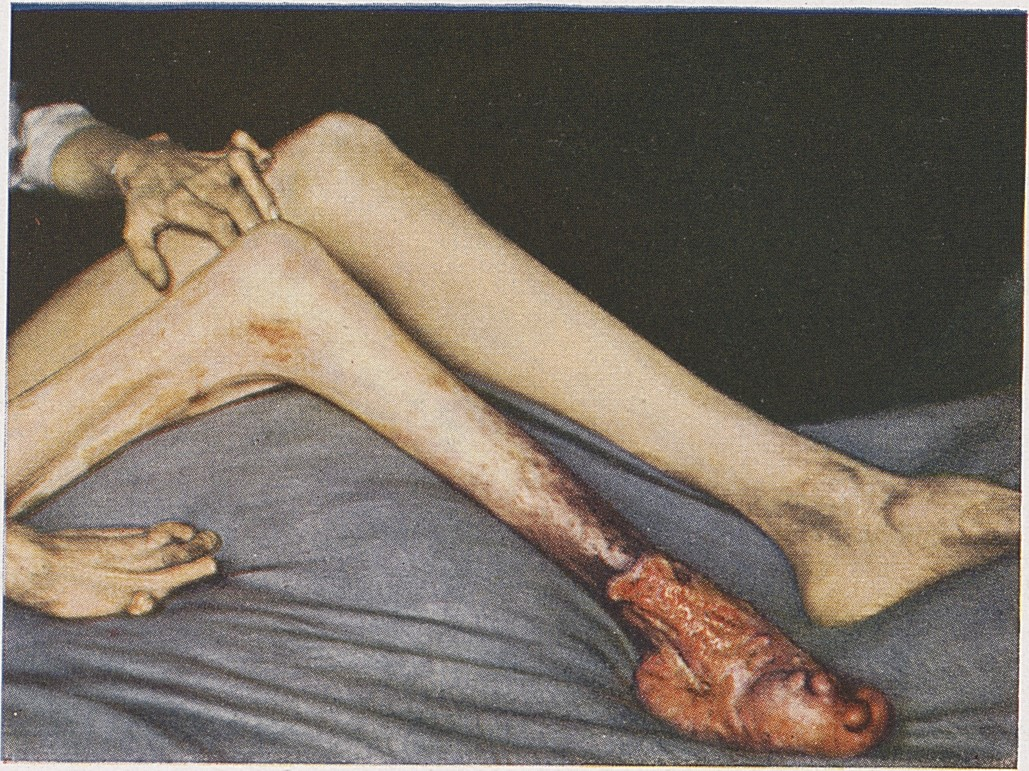
Systemic scleroderma in the limbs, showing carcinoma subsequent to ulceration

In the skin, systemic sclerosis causes hardening and scarring. The skin may appear tight, reddish, or scaly. Blood vessels may also be more visible. Where large areas are affected, fat and muscle wastage may weaken limbs and affect appearance. Patients report severe and recurrent itching of large skin areas. The severity of these symptoms varies greatly among patients: Some having scleroderma of only a limited area of the skin (such as the fingers) and little involvement of the underlying tissue, while others have progressive skin involvement. Digital ulcers—open wounds especially on fingertips and less commonly the knuckles—are not uncommon.

=== Other organs ===
Diffuse scleroderma can cause musculoskeletal, pulmonary, gastrointestinal, renal, and other complications. Patients with greater cutaneous involvement are more likely to have involvement of the internal tissues and organs. Most patients (over 80%) have vascular symptoms and Raynaud's phenomenon, which leads to attacks of discoloration of the hands and feet in response to cold. Raynaud's normally affects the fingers and toes. Systemic scleroderma and Raynaud's can cause painful ulcers on the fingers or toes, which are known as digital ulcers. Calcinosis (deposition of calcium in lumps under the skin) is also common in systemic scleroderma, and is often seen near the elbows, knees, or other joints.

Musculoskeletal

The first joint symptoms that patients with scleroderma have are typically nonspecific joint pains, which can lead to arthritis, or cause discomfort in tendons or muscles. Joint mobility, especially of the small joints of the hand, may be restricted by calcinosis or skin thickening. Patients may develop muscle weakness, or myopathy, either from the disease or its treatments.

Lungs

Some impairment in lung function is almost universally seen in patients with diffuse scleroderma on pulmonary function testing, but it does not necessarily cause symptoms, such as shortness of breath. Some patients can develop pulmonary hypertension, or elevation in the pressures of the pulmonary arteries. This can be progressive, and can lead to right-sided heart failure. The earliest manifestation of this may be a decreased diffusion capacity on pulmonary function testing. Other pulmonary complications in more advanced disease include aspiration pneumonia, pulmonary hemorrhage and pneumothorax.

Digestive tract

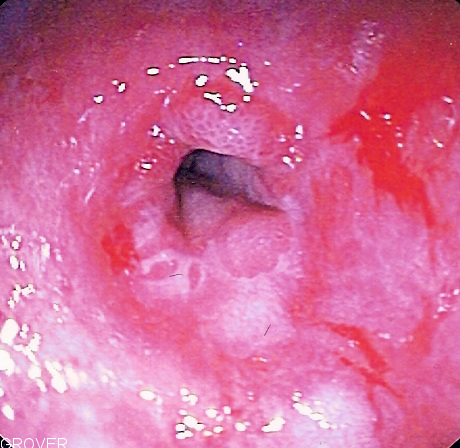
Endoscopic image of peptic stricture, or narrowing of the esophagus near the junction with the stomach due to chronic gastroesophageal reflux: This is the most common cause of dysphagia, or difficulty swallowing, in scleroderma.

Diffuse scleroderma can affect any part of the gastrointestinal tract. The most common manifestation in the esophagus is reflux esophagitis, which may be complicated by esophageal strictures or benign narrowing of the esophagus. This is best initially treated with proton pump inhibitors for acid suppression, but may require bougie dilatation in the case of stricture.

Scleroderma can decrease motility anywhere in the gastrointestinal tract. The most common source of decreased motility is the esophagus and the lower esophageal sphincter, leading to dysphagia and chest pain. As scleroderma progresses, esophageal involvement from abnormalities in decreased motility may worsen due to progressive fibrosis (scarring). If this is left untreated, acid from the stomach can back up into the esophagus, causing esophagitis and gastroesophageal reflux disease. Further scarring from acid damage to the lower esophagus many times leads to the development of fibrotic narrowing, also known as strictures, which can be treated by dilatation.

In patients with neuromuscular disorders, particularly progressive systemic sclerosis and visceral myopathy, the duodenum is frequently involved. Dilatation may occur, which is often more pronounced in the second, third, and fourth parts. The dilated duodenum may be slow to empty, and the grossly dilated, atonic organ may produce a sump effect.

The small intestine can also become involved, leading to bacterial overgrowth and malabsorption of bile salts, fats, carbohydrates, proteins, and vitamins. The colon can be involved, and can cause pseudo-obstruction or ischemic colitis.

Rarer complications include pneumatosis cystoides intestinalis, or gas pockets in the bowel wall, wide-mouthed diverticula in the colon and esophagus, and liver fibrosis. Patients with severe gastrointestinal involvement can become profoundly malnourished.

Scleroderma may also be associated with gastric antral vascular ectasia, also known as "watermelon stomach". This is a condition in which atypical blood vessels proliferate, usually in a radially symmetric pattern around the pylorus of the stomach. It can be a cause of upper gastrointestinal bleeding or iron-deficiency anemia in patients with scleroderma.

Kidneys

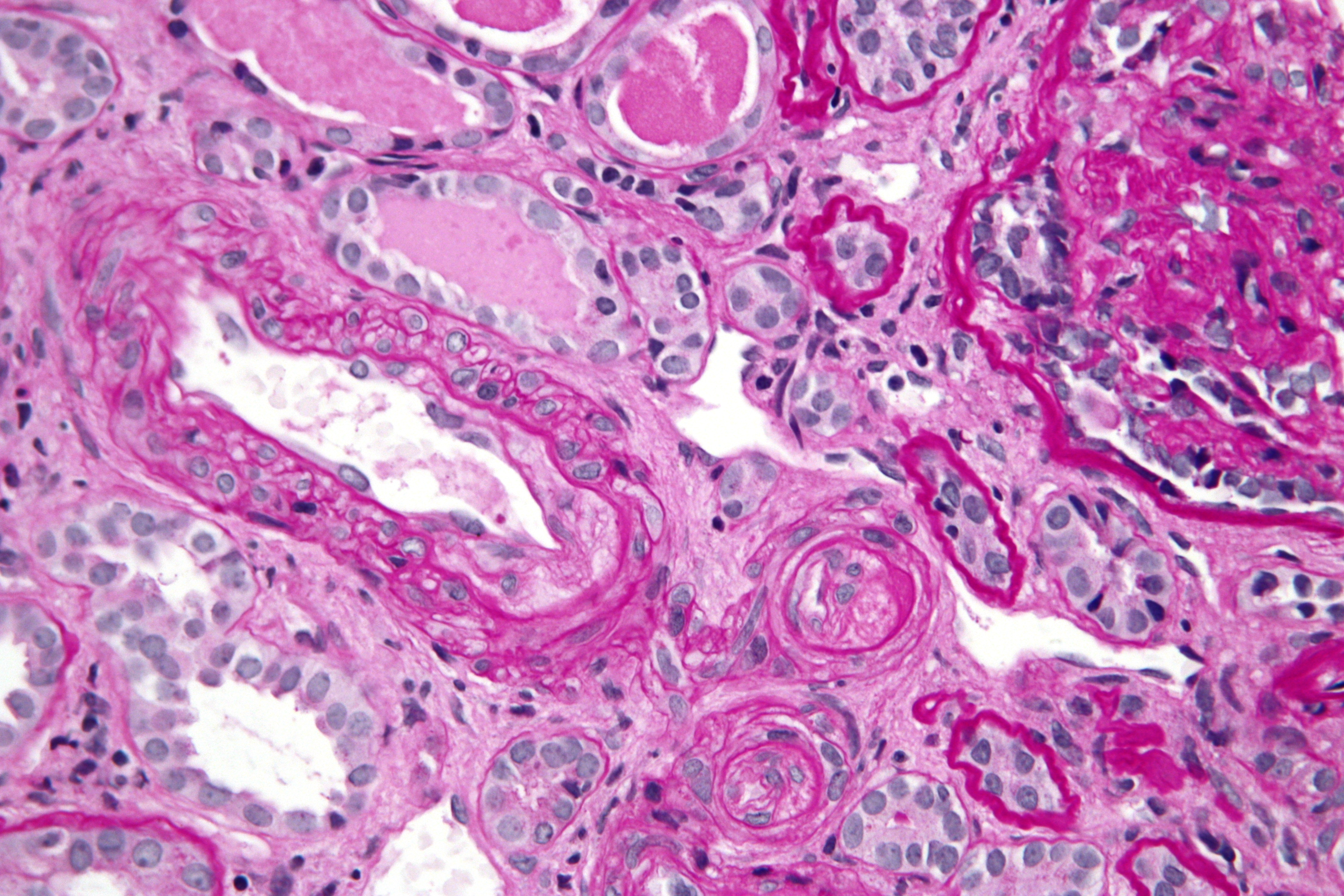
Micrograph showing thrombotic microangiopathy, the histomorphologic finding seen in scleroderma renal crisis, kidney biopsy, PAS stain

Kidney involvement, in scleroderma, is considered a poor prognostic factor and frequently a cause of death.

The most important clinical complication of scleroderma involving the kidney is scleroderma renal crisis (SRC), the symptoms of which are malignant hypertension (high blood pressure with evidence of acute organ damage), hyperreninemia (high renin levels), azotemia (kidney failure with accumulation of waste products in the blood), and microangiopathic hemolytic anemia (destruction of red blood cells). Apart from the high blood pressure, hematuria (blood in the urine) and proteinuria (protein loss in the urine) may be indicative of SRC.

In the past, SRC was almost uniformly fatal. While outcomes have improved significantly with the use of ACE inhibitors, the prognosis is often guarded, as a significant number of patients are refractory to treatment and develop kidney failure. About 7–9% of all diffuse cutaneous scleroderma patients develop renal crisis at some point in the course of their disease. Patients who have rapid skin involvement have the highest risk of renal complications. It is most common in diffuse cutaneous scleroderma, and is often associated with antibodies against RNA polymerase (in 59% of cases). Many proceed to dialysis, although this can be stopped within three years in about a third of cases. Higher age and (paradoxically) a lower blood pressure at presentation make dialysis more likely to be needed.

Treatments for SRC include ACE inhibitors. Prophylactic use of ACE inhibitors is currently not recommended, as recent data suggest a poorer prognosis in patient treated with these drugs prior to the development of renal crisis. Transplanted kidneys are known to be affected by scleroderma, and patients with early-onset renal disease (within one year of the scleroderma diagnosis) are thought to have the highest risk for recurrence.

== Causes ==
No clear cause for scleroderma and systemic sclerosis has been identified. Genetic predisposition appears to be limited, as genetic concordance is small; still, a familial predisposition for autoimmune disease is often seen. Polymorphisms in COL1A2 and TGF-β1 may influence severity and development of the disease. Evidence implicating cytomegalovirus (CMV) as the original epitope of the immune reaction is limited, as is parvovirus B19. Organic solvents and other chemical agents have been linked with scleroderma.

One of the suspected mechanisms behind the autoimmune phenomenon is the existence of microchimerism, i.e. fetal cells circulating in maternal blood, triggering an immune reaction to what is perceived as foreign material.

A distinct form of scleroderma and systemic sclerosis may develop in patients with chronic kidney failure. This form, nephrogenic fibrosing dermopathy or nephrogenic systemic fibrosis, has been linked to exposure to gadolinium-containing radiocontrast.

Bleomycin (a chemotherapeutic agent) and possibly taxane chemotherapy may cause scleroderma, and occupational exposure to solvents has been linked to an increased risk of systemic sclerosis.

== Pathophysiology ==
Overproduction of collagen is thought to result from an autoimmune dysfunction, in which the immune system starts to attack the kinetochore of the chromosomes. This would lead to genetic malfunction of nearby genes. T cells accumulate in the skin; these are thought to secrete cytokines and other proteins that stimulate collagen deposition. Stimulation of the fibroblast, in particular, seems to be crucial to the disease process, and studies have converged on the potential factors that produce this effect.

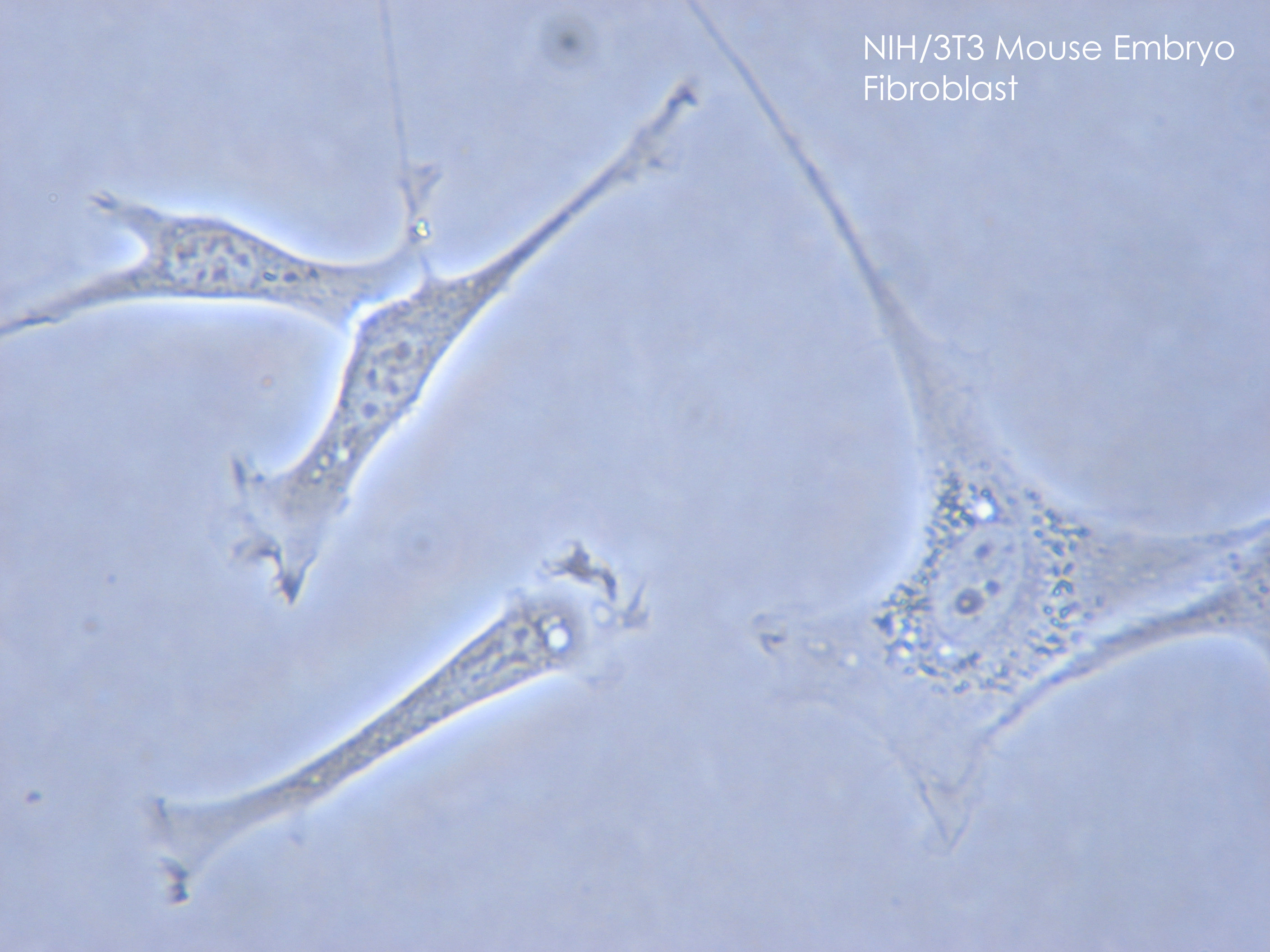
Fibroblasts

A significant player in the process is transforming growth factor (TGFβ). This protein appears to be overproduced, and the fibroblast (possibly in response to other stimuli) also overexpresses the receptor for this mediator. An intracellular pathway (consisting of SMAD2/SMAD3, SMAD4, and the inhibitor SMAD7) is responsible for the secondary messenger system that induces transcription of the proteins and enzymes responsible for collagen deposition. Sp1 is a transcription factor most closely studied in this context. Apart from TGFβ, connective tissue growth factor (CTGF) has a possible role. Indeed, a common CTGF gene polymorphism is present at an increased level in systemic sclerosis.

Damage to endothelium is an early abnormality in the development of scleroderma, and this, too, seems to be due to collagen accumulation by fibroblasts, although direct alterations by cytokines, platelet adhesion, and a type II hypersensitivity reaction similarly have been implicated. Increased endothelin and decreased vasodilation have been documented.

Jimenez and Derk describe three theories about the development of scleroderma:

- The abnormalities are primarily due to a physical agent, and all other changes are secondary or reactive to this direct insult.
- The initial event is fetomaternal cell transfer causing microchimerism, with a second summative cause (e.g. environmental) leading to the actual development of the disease.
- Physical causes lead to phenotypic alterations in susceptible cells (e.g. due to genetic makeup), which then effectuate DNA changes that alter the cells' behavior.

== Diagnosis ==
In 1980, the American College of Rheumatology agreed on diagnostic criteria for scleroderma.

Diagnosis is by clinical suspicion, presence of autoantibodies (specifically anticentromere and anti-Scl-70 antibodies), and occasionally by biopsy. Of the antibodies, 90% have a detectable antinuclear antibody. Anticentromere antibody is more common in the limited form (80–90%) than in the diffuse form (10%), and anti-Scl-70 is more common in the diffuse form (30–40%) and in African-American patients (who are more susceptible to the systemic form).

Other conditions may mimic systemic sclerosis by causing hardening of the skin. Diagnostic hints that another disorder is responsible include the absence of Raynaud's phenomenon, a lack of abnormalities in the skin on the hands, a lack of internal organ involvement, and a normal antinuclear antibodies test result.

== Treatment ==
No cure for scleroderma is known, though treatments exist for some of the symptoms, including drugs that soften the skin and reduce inflammation. Some patients may benefit from exposure to heat. Holistic care of patients comprising patient education tailored to patients' education level is useful in view of the complex nature of the disease symptoms and progress.

=== Topical/symptomatic ===
Topical treatment for the skin changes of scleroderma do not alter the disease course, but may improve pain and ulceration. A range of nonsteroidal anti-inflammatory drugs, such as naproxen, can be used to ease painful symptoms. The benefit from steroids such as prednisone is limited. Episodes of Raynaud's phenomenon sometimes respond to nifedipine or other calcium channel blockers; severe digital ulceration may respond to prostacyclin analogue iloprost, and the dual endothelin-receptor antagonist bosentan may be beneficial for Raynaud's phenomenon. Skin tightness may be treated systemically with methotrexate and ciclosporin. and the skin thickness can be treated with penicillamine.

=== Kidney disease ===
Scleroderma renal crisis (SRC) is a life-threatening complication of systemic sclerosis that may be the initial manifestation of the disease. Renal vascular injury (due in part to collagen deposition) leads to renal ischemia, which results in activation of the renin-angiotensin-aldosterone system (RAAS). This raises blood pressure and further damages the renal vasculature, causing a vicious cycle of worsening hypertension and renal dysfunction (e.g., elevated creatinine, edema). Hypertensive emergency with end-organ dysfunction (e.g., encephalopathy, retinal hemorrhage) is common. Thrombocytopenia and microangiopathic hemolytic anemia can be seen. Urinalysis is usually normal but may show mild proteinuria, as in this patient; casts are unexpected.

The mainstay of therapy for SRC includes ACE inhibitors, which reduce RAAS activity and improve renal function and blood pressure. Short-acting ACE inhibitors (typically captopril) are used because they can be rapidly uptitrated. An elevated serum creatinine level is not a contraindication for ACE inhibitors in this population, and slight elevations in creatinine are common during drug initiation.

Scleroderma renal crisis, the occurrence of acute kidney injury, and malignant hypertension (very high blood pressure with evidence of organ damage) in people with scleroderma are effectively treated with drugs from the class of the ACE inhibitors. The benefit of ACE inhibitors extends even to those who have to commence dialysis to treat their kidney disease, and may give sufficient benefit to allow the discontinuation of renal replacement therapy.

=== Lung disease ===
Active alveolitis is often treated with pulses of cyclophosphamide, often together with a small dose of steroids. The benefit of this intervention is modest.Pulmonary hypertension may be treated with epoprostenol, treprostinil, bosentan, and possibly aerolized iloprost. Nintedanib was approved for use in the United States Food and Drug Administration on September 6, 2019, to slow the rate of decline in pulmonary function in patients with systemic sclerosis-associated interstitial lung disease (SSc-ILD).

=== Other ===
Some evidence indicates that plasmapheresis (therapeutic plasma exchange) can be used to treat the systemic form of scleroderma. In Italy, it is a government-approved treatment option. This is done by replacing blood plasma with a fluid consisting of albumin, and is thought to keep the disease at bay by reducing the circulation of scleroderma autoantibodies.

== Prognosis ==
A 2018 study placed 10-year survival rates at 88%, without differentiation based on subtype. Diffuse systemic sclerosis, internal organ complications, and older age at diagnosis are associated with worse prognoses.

== Epidemiology ==
Systemic scleroderma is a rare disease, with an annual incidence that varies in different populations. Estimates of incidence (new cases per million people) range from 3.7 to 43 in the United Kingdom and Europe, 7.2 in Japan, 10.9 in Taiwan, 12.0 to 22.8 in Australia, 13.9 to 21.0 in the United States, and 21.2 in Buenos Aires. The interval of peak onset starts at age 30 and ends at age 50.

Globally, estimates of prevalence vary from 31.0 to 658.6 affected people per million. Systemic sclerosis has a female:male ratio of 3:1 (8:1 in mid- to late childbearing years). Incidence is twice as high among African Americans. Full-blooded Choctaw Native Americans in Oklahoma have the highest prevalence in the world (469 per 100,000).

The disease has some hereditary association. It may also be caused by an immune reaction to a virus (molecular mimicry) or by toxins.

== Research ==
Given the difficulty in treating scleroderma, treatments with a smaller evidence base are often tried to control the disease. These include antithymocyte globulin and mycophenolate mofetil; some reports have shown improvements in the skin symptoms, as well as delaying the progress of systemic disease, but neither has been subjected to large clinical trials.

Autologous hematopoietic stem cell transplantation (HSCT) is based on the assumption that autoimmune diseases such as systemic sclerosis occur when the white blood cells of the immune system attack the body. In this treatment, stem cells from the patient's blood are extracted and stored to preserve them. The patient's white blood cells are destroyed with cyclophosphamide and rabbit antibodies against the white blood cells. Then, the stored blood is returned to the patient's bloodstream to reconstitute a healthy blood and immune system that will not attack the body. The results of a phase-III trial, the Autologous Stem Cell Transplantation International Scleroderma (ASTIS) trial, with 156 patients, were published in 2014. HSCT itself has a high treatment mortality, so in the first year, the survival of patients in the treatment group was lower than the placebo group, but at the end of 10 years, the survival in the treatment group was significantly higher. The authors concluded that HSCT could be effective, if limited to patients who were healthy enough to survive HSCT itself. Therefore, HSCT should be given early in the progression of the disease, before it does damage. Patients with heart disease, and patients who smoked cigarettes, were less likely to survive. Another trial, the Stem Cell Transplant vs. Cyclophosphamide (SCOT) trial, is ongoing.

Asengeprast is an experimental systemic scleroderma drug candidate. It is a small molecule inhibitor of the G-protein coupled receptor GPR68 with antifibrotic activity.

== Society and culture ==
=== Support groups ===
The Juvenile Scleroderma Network is an organization dedicated to providing emotional support and educational information to parents and their children living with juvenile scleroderma, supporting pediatric research to identify the cause of and the cure for juvenile scleroderma, and enhancing public awareness.

In the US, the Scleroderma Foundation is dedicated to raise awareness of the disease and assist those who are affected.

The Scleroderma Research Foundation sponsors research into the condition. Comedian and television presenter Bob Saget, a board member of the SRF, directed the 1996 ABC TV movie For Hope, starring Dana Delany, which depicts a young woman fatally affected by scleroderma; the film was based on the experiences of Saget's sister Gay.

Scleroderma and Raynaud's UK is a British charity formed by the merger of two smaller organisations in 2016 to provide support for people with scleroderma and fund research into the condition.
