= Etabonate =

Class of chemical compounds

The etabonate group

Etabonate or ethyl carbonate is the chemical group with formula –CO_{3}–C_{2}H_{5}, or H_{3}C–CH_{2}–O–C(=O)–O–. The names are also used for esters R–OCO_{2}C_{2}H_{5}, for the anion [C_{2}H_{5}OCO^{−}_{2}], and for salts of the latter.

== Pharmaceutical aspects ==
"Etabonate" is an international nonproprietary name (INN) and United States Adopted Name (USAN) for pharmaceutical substances and is the name almost universally used in pharmacology. some important drugs featuring that group are

- Loteprednol etabonate, a corticosteroid
- Remogliflozin etabonate, an anti-diabetic drug
- Sergliflozin etabonate, another anti-diabetic drug

== Chemical aspects ==
"Ethyl carbonate" is the name commonly used in chemistry. Important non-medical esters with that group are

- Diethyl carbonate, (H_{3}C–CH_{2}–O–)_{2}C=O
- methyl ethyl carbonate, (H_{3}C–OC(=O)O–C_{2}H_{5}

Alkali salts of that anion, such as sodium ethyl carbonate, are known and fairly stable at ambient conditions. They have been proposed as an economical and environmentally friendly intermediate for the synthesis of organic compounds from carbon dioxide. They can be obtained by reaction of carbon dioxide with alkali ethoxides:

[C_{2}H_{5}O^{−}] [M^{+}] + CO_{2} → [C_{2}H_{5}OCO^{−}_{2}] [M^{+}]

where M could be sodium or potassium. The ethoxide could be produced on a laboratory scale by reaction of ethanol with alkali metal,

C_{2}H_{5}OH + M → [C_{2}H_{5}O^{−}] [M^{+}] + ½H_{2}

or, more economically and safely, by reaction with alkali hydroxide

C_{2}H_{5}OH + MOH → [C_{2}H_{5}O^{−}] [M^{+}] + H_{2}O

at about 80 °C, using calcium oxide (quicklime) as a dehydrating agent to drive the reaction forward.

Sodium ethyl carbonate is reported to be a white crystalline solid, nearly insoluble in many organic solvents (including diethyl ether, ethanol, acetone, and benzene), that decomposes without melting at 380-400 °C.

In contrast, the hypothetical conjugate ethylcarbonic acid HOC(=O)O–C_{2}H_{5} is not known and (like carbonic acid) may be stable only at very low temperatures.

== History ==
Ethyl carbonate esters were described in 1837 by Jean-Baptiste André Dumas (1800-1884) and his assistant Eugène-Melchior Peligot (1811-1890), during their investigation of the nature of sugars (which had been incorrectly conjectured to be the same compounds).

== See also ==
- Retrometabolic drug design
- Methyl carbonate
- Dimethyl carbonate
