= Context-sensitive half-life =

Context-sensitive half-life or context sensitive half-time is defined as the time taken for blood plasma concentration of a drug to decline by one half after an infusion designed to maintain a steady state (i.e. a constant plasma concentration) has been stopped. The "context" is the duration of infusion.

When a drug which has a multicompartmental pharmacokinetic model is given by intravenous infusion it initially will distribute to the central compartment and then move out of this compartment into one or two peripheral compartments. Once this infusion is discontinued, drug continues to move into the peripheral compartments until an equilibrium is reached. At this time, the only way drug may leave plasma is by metabolism or excretion. As the plasma concentration falls, the concentration gradient of drug reverses and drug moves from peripheral compartments back into plasma, maintaining the plasma concentration of the drug, often prolonging the pharmacological effect. If an infusion has reached steady state then the context-sensitive half-life is equal to the terminal plasma half-life of the drug. Otherwise it will be shorter than the terminal elimination half-life.

Remifentanil is relatively context insensitive whilst fentanyl and thiopentone are examples of drugs which have significant context-sensitive changes in their half-life.

The Context-Sensitive Half-Time describes the time required for the plasma drug concentration to decline by 50% after terminating an infusion of a particular duration.

== Definition ==
It is the time required for drug plasma concentration to decrease by 50% after stopping administration. The drug is administered continuously.

== Pharmacokinetics ==
- Many drugs follow the multi-compartment model. In other words, a drug may have a preference for a particular body compartment which will result in the majority of that drug to ultimately settle in that particular compartment.
  - For highly polar drugs very little will be in the tissues of the body
  - For highly lipophilic drugs majority of drug will be located in body tissues
- Initially, because the drug is given intravenously, the drug will distribute to the central compartment (i.e. circulation system). The drug (e.g. lipophilic drug) will move out of the central compartment and move into the peripheral compartments
  - The movement from one compartment to another is influenced by passive diffusion (Moves from an area of high concentration to one with low concentration)
- A drug like fentanyl is very fat soluble. Initial doses ‘wear off’ relatively quickly because the drug redistributes to adipose tissue. However, if the infusion is ongoing then the peripheral compartment (body tissue) will have a large store of fentanyl
- The duration of infusion determines whether or not steady state was reached
  - Once a drug enters the body, elimination and distribution begins. Initially the drug present in central compartment (i.e. circulation system) is being distributed into the tissues, and being eliminated
  - At steady state, the concentration of free drug in the central compartment (i.e. circulation system) is equal to the concentration of free drug in the peripheral compartment (i.e. body tissues)
- If steady state is reached, context-sensitive half-life is equal to elimination half-life
  - Only free drug that is in the plasma is metabolised
  - Metabolism results in the concentration of free drug in the peripheral compartment to decrease
  - Due to passive diffusion, free drug will leave the peripheral compartment (i.e. tissues) and enter the central compartment, replenishing any drug that was metabolised from the plasma
- If steady state is not reached, context-sensitive half-life is shorter than elimination half-life
  - Only free drug that is in the plasma is metabolised
  - Overall the entire body has less lipophilic drug. The infusion was stopped earlier. Not as much drug was able to enter the peripheral compartment.
  - Because steady state is not reached, the peripheral compartment (i.e. tissues) has less free drug than the central compartment
  - The drug continues to move into the peripheral compartment until equilibrium is reached. Remember the drug moves due to passive diffusion. It moves into the peripheral compartment because it has less free drug
  - Once equilibrium is reached, the only other way the drug is able to leave the plasma is by elimination. This causes the free drug concentration in the central compartment to fall
  - As the plasma concentration falls, the concentration gradient of drug reverses and drug moves from peripheral compartment (i.e. tissues) back into plasma, maintaining the plasma concentration of the drug

Remifentanil is relatively context insensitive. Fentanyl and thiopental are examples of drugs which have significant context-sensitive changes in their half-life.
