= Benziodarone =

Chemical compound

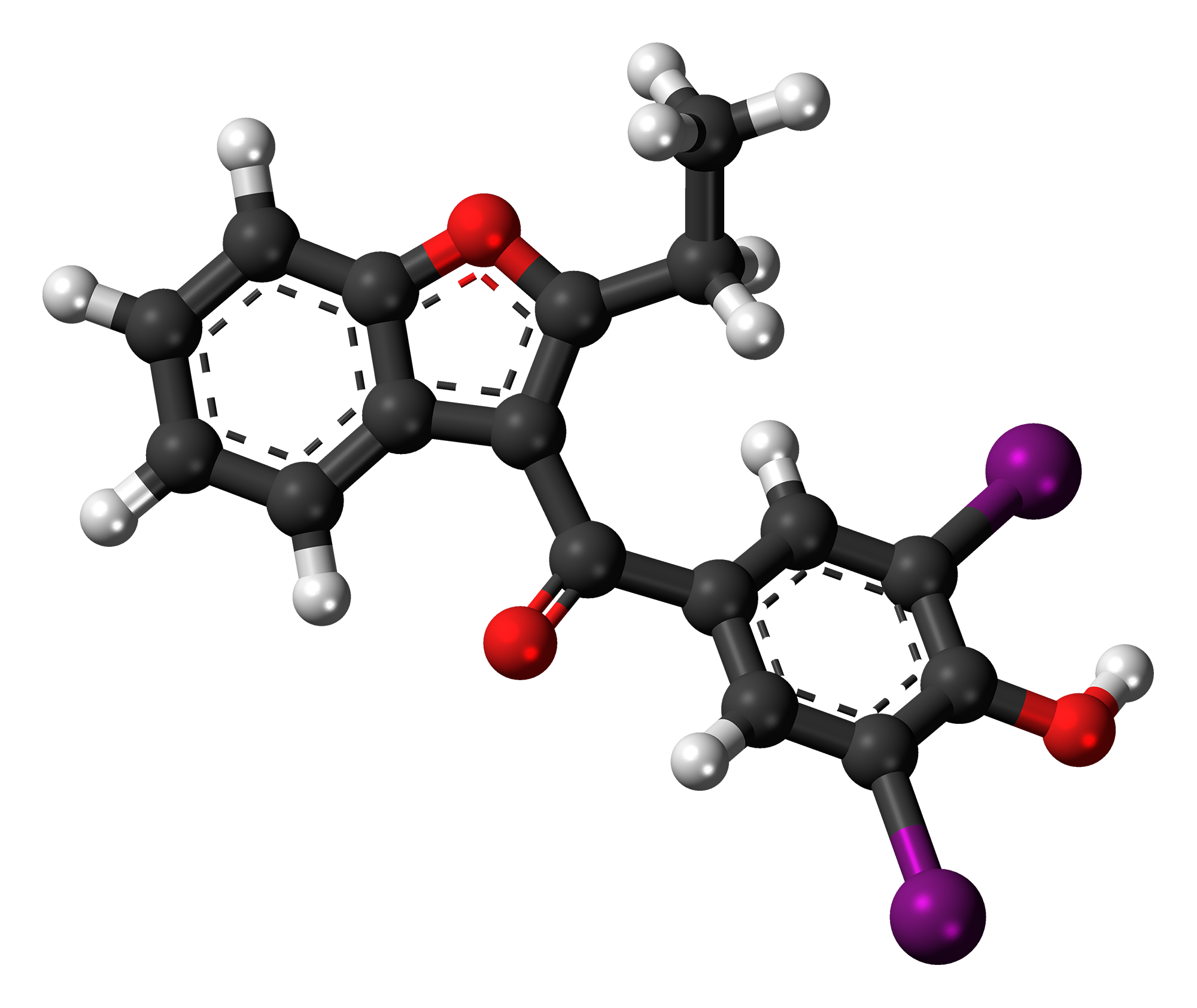

Clinical data
- ATC code: C01DX04 (WHO)

Identifiers
- IUPAC name: 4-[(2-ethyl-1-benzofuran-3-yl)carbonyl]-2,6-diiodophenol
- CAS Number: 68-90-6
- PubChem CID: 6237
- ChemSpider: 6001
- UNII: 75CL65GTYR
- ChEMBL: ChEMBL232201
- CompTox Dashboard (EPA): DTXSID1046134
- ECHA InfoCard: 100.000.632

Chemical and physical data
- Formula: C_{17}H_{12}I_{2}O_{3}
- Molar mass: 518.089 g·mol^{−1}
- InChI: InChI=1S/C17H12I2O3/c1-2-13-15(10-5-3-4-6-14(10)22-13)16(20)9-7-11(18)17(21)12(19)8-9/h3-8,21H,2H2,1H3; Key:CZCHIEJNWPNBDE-UHFFFAOYSA-N

Benziodarone is a vasodilator.

Benziodaron synthesis: U.S. patent 3,012,042

- Bufeniode has the same aromatic substitution pattern.

== See also ==
- Amiodarone
- Benzbromarone, the brominated analogue of benziodarone, used as an uricosuric
- Dronedarone
