= Differential diagnoses of anorexia nervosa =

Common disorder misdiagnosis

The differential diagnoses of anorexia nervosa (AN) includes various types of medical and psychological conditions, which may be misdiagnosed as AN. In some cases, these conditions may be comorbid with AN because the misdiagnosis of AN is not uncommon. For example, a case of achalasia was misdiagnosed as AN and the patient spent two months confined to a psychiatric hospital. A reason for the differential diagnoses that surround AN arise mainly because, like other disorders, it is primarily, albeit defensively and adaptive for, the individual concerned. Anorexia Nervosa is a psychological disorder characterized by extremely reduced intake of food. People with anorexia nervosa tend to have a low self-image and an inaccurate perception of their body.

Common behaviors and signs of someone with AN:

- Forcing oneself to vigorously exercise even in adverse conditions or when their health does not permit it.
- Forcing own self to urinate and excrete waste product from the body.
- Using substituted amphetamines (stimulants that can reduce appetite) to reduce appetite.
- Skin turning yellow

== Medical ==
Some of the differential or comorbid medical diagnoses may include:

- achalasia – There have been cases where achalasia, a disorder of the esophagus which affects peristalsis, has been misdiagnosed as AN. It has been reported in cases where there is sub-clinical manifestation of anorexia nervosa and also in cases where the full diagnostic criteria AN have been met.
- acute pandysautonomia is one form of an autonomic neuropathy, which is a collection of various syndromes and diseases which affect the autonomic neurons of the autonomic nervous system (ANS). Autonomic neuropathies may be the result of an inherited condition or they may be acquired due to various premorbid conditions such as diabetes and alcoholism, bacterial infection such as Lyme disease or a viral illness. Some of the symptoms of ANS which may be associated with an ED include nausea, dysphagia, constipation, pain in the salivary glands, early satiety. It also affects peristalsis in the stomach. Acute pandysautonomia may cause emotional instability and has been misdiagnosed as various psychiatric disorders including hysterical neurosis and anorexia nervosa.
- Lupus: various neuropsychiatric symptoms are associated with systemic lupus erythematosus (SLE), including depression. Anorexia and weight loss also may occur with SLE and while rare it may be misdiagnosed as AN.
- Lyme disease is known as the "great imitator", as it may present as a variety of psychiatric or neurologic disorders including anorexia nervosa. "A 12 year old boy with confirmed Lyme arthritis treated with oral antibiotics subsequently became depressed and anorectic. After being admitted to a psychiatric hospital with the diagnosis of anorexia nervosa, he was noted to have positive serologic tests for Borrelia burgdorferi. Treatment with a 14 day course of intravenous antibiotics led to a resolution of his depression and anorexia; this improvement was sustained on 3 year follow-up." Serologic testing can be helpful but should not be the sole basis for diagnosis. The Centers for Disease Control (CDC) issued a cautionary statement (MMWR 54;125) regarding the use of several commercial tests. Clinical diagnostic criteria have been issued by the CDC (CDC, MMWR 1997; 46: 531–535).
- Mitochondrial neurogastrointestinal encephalomyopathy (MNGIE) is a rare genetic disorder characterized by gastrointestinal dysmotility, severe cachexia progressive external ophthalmoplegia, post-prandial emesis (vomiting after eating), peripheral neuropathy, and diffuse leukoencephalopathy. Onset is prior to age 20 in 60% of cases. ""Miss A" was a 21-year-old Indian woman diagnosed as having treatment-resistant anorexia nervosa." It was subsequently proven to be MNGIE
- superior mesenteric artery syndrome (SMA syndrome) "is a gastrointestinal disorder characterized by the compression of the third or transverse portion of the duodenum against the aorta by the superior mesenteric artery resulting in chronic partial, incomplete, acute or intermittent duodenal obstruction". It may occur as a complication of AN or as a differential diagnosis. There have been reported cases of a tentative diagnosis of AN, where upon treatment for SMA syndrome the patient is asymptomatic.
- Addison's disease is a disorder of the adrenal cortex which results in decreased hormonal production. Addison's disease, even in subclinical form, may mimic many of the symptoms of anorexia nervosa.
- Brain tumors: There are multiple cases were the neuropsychiatric symptoms of a brain tumor were attributed to AN, resulting in misdiagnosis. The tumors in these cases were noted in various regions of the brain including the medulla oblongata, hypothalamus, pituitary gland, pineal gland and the obex.
  - Simmond's disease (organic hypopituitarism) – "A 20-year-old Japanese man with a hypothalamic tumor which caused hypopituitarism and diabetes insipidus was mistakenly diagnosed as anorexia nervosa because of anorexia, weight loss, denial of being ill, changes in personality, and abnormal behavior resembling the clinical characteristics of anorexia nervosa"
  - Brain calcification either dystrophic calcification or metastatic calcification can present with neuropsychiatric symptoms including those associated with AN and comorbid disorders such as obsessive–compulsive disorder.
  - cysts that occur in the central nervous system such as dermoid cysts and arachnoid cysts can cause neuropsychiatric symptoms including psychosis.
- Celiac disease is an inflammatory disorder triggered by peptides from wheat and similar grains which cause an immune reaction in the small intestine. Although foreseen by medical professionals due to lack of diagnosis, eating disorders is a comorbid condition to Celiac Disease. (Leffler DA et al.)
- Pica is the regular digestion of non-nutritive substances. Pica is a common gastrointestinal disease connected to the development of anorexia nervosa . (Leffler DA et al.)
- Gall bladder disease which may be caused by inflammation, infection, gallstones, obstruction of the gallbladder or torsion of the gall bladder – Many of the symptoms of gall bladder disease may mimic anorexia nervosa (AN). Laura Daly, a woman from Missouri, had an inherited disorder in which the gall bladder was not properly attached; the resultant complications led to multiple erroneous diagnoses of AN. Upon performance of a CCK test, standard imaging techniques are done with the patient lying prone, in this instance it was done with the patient in an upright position. The gall bladder was shown to be in an abnormal position having flipped over the liver. The gallbladder was removed and the patient has since recovered. The treatment was performed by William P. Smedley in Pennsylvania.
- colonic tuberculosis misdiagnosed as anorexia nervosa in a physician at the hospital where she worked – "This patient, who had severe wasting, was misdiagnosed as having anorexia nervosa despite the presence of other symptoms suggestive of an organic disease, namely, fever and diarrhea"(Madani, A 2002).
- Crohn's disease: "We report three cases of young 18 to 25 year-old girls, initially treated for anorexia nervosa in a psychiatric department. Diagnosis of Crohn's disease was made within 5 to 13 years."(Blanchet C, Luton JP. 2002)"This disease should be diagnostically excluded before accepting anorexia nervosa as final diagnosis". (Wellmann W et al.)
- hypothyroidism, hyperthyroidism, hypoparathyroidism and hyperparathyroidism may mimic some of the symptoms of, can occur concurrently with, be masked by or exacerbate an eating disorder and/or various comorbid disorders such as anxiety and depression.
- Insulinomas are (pancreatic tumors) that cause an overproduction of insulin, causing hypoglycemia. Various neurological deficits have been ascribed to this condition including misdiagnosis as an eating disorder.
- Multiple sclerosis (encephalomyelitis disseminata) is a progressive autoimmune disorder in which the protective covering (myelin sheath) of nerve cells is damaged as a result of inflammation and resultant attack by the bodies own immune system. In its initial presentation, MS has been misdiagnosed as an eating disorder.

== Psychological ==
There are various other psychological issues that may factor into anorexia nervosa, some fulfill the criteria for a separate Axis I diagnosis or a personality disorder which is coded Axis II and thus are considered comorbid to the diagnosed eating disorder. Axis II disorders are subtyped into 3 "clusters", A, B and C. The causality between personality disorders and eating disorders has yet to be fully established. Some people have a previous disorder which may increase their vulnerability to developing an eating disorder. Some develop them afterwards. The severity and type of eating disorder symptoms have been shown to affect comorbidity. These comorbid disorders themselves have multiple differential diagnoses, such as depression which may be caused by such disparate causes such as Lyme disease or hypothyroidism.

- Body dysmorphic disorder (BDD) is listed as a somatoform disorder that affects up to 2% of the population. BDD is characterized by excessive rumination over an actual or perceived physical flaw. These flaws are typically unnoticeable to others. BDD has been diagnosed equally among men and women and can affect people of any age. However, BDD most commonly affects teenagers and young adults. While BDD has been misdiagnosed as anorexia nervosa, it also occurs comorbidly in 25% to 39% of AN cases.

BDD is a chronic and debilitating condition which may lead to social isolation, major depression, suicidal ideation and attempts. Neuroimaging studies to measure response to facial recognition have shown activity predominately in the left hemisphere in the left lateral prefrontal cortex, lateral temporal lobe and left parietal lobe showing hemispheric imbalance in information processing. There is a reported case of the development of BDD in a 21-year-old male following an inflammatory brain process. Neuroimaging showed the presence of new atrophy in the frontotemporal region.

- Emetophobia is an anxiety disorder characterized by an intense fear of vomiting. A person so affected may develop rigorous standards of food hygiene, such as not touching food with their hands. They may become socially withdrawn to avoid situations which in their perception may make them vomit. Many who have emetophobia are diagnosed with anorexia or self-starvation. In severe cases of emetophobia they may drastically reduce their food intake.
- Food avoidance emotional disorder is an eating disorder that affects children which involves a fear of eating which is not accompanied by a fear of weight gain which may be misdiagnosed as anorexia nervosa.
- phagophobia is an anxiety disorder characterized by a fear of eating, it is usually initiated by an adverse experience while eating such as choking or vomiting. Individuals with this disorder may present with complaints of pain while swallowing. There have been cases of it being misdiagnosed as AN. A similar phobic anxiety disorder, swallowing phobia may also lead to a misdiagnosis of anorexia nervosa; such individuals do not want to lose weight but typically want to put weight back on that they have lost due to their phobia.

Comorbid disorders
Axis I	Axis II				
depression	obsessive–compulsive personality disorder				
substance abuse, alcoholism	borderline personality disorder				
anxiety disorders	narcissistic personality disorder	obsessive–compulsive disorder	histrionic personality disorder	obsessive–compulsive disorder	histrionic personality disorder
Attention-Deficit-Hyperactivity-Disorder	avoidant personality disorder				

The distinction between the diagnoses of anorexia nervosa, bulimia nervosa and eating disorder not otherwise specified (EDNOS) is often difficult to make as there is considerable overlap between patients diagnosed with these conditions. Seemingly minor changes in a patient's overall behavior or attitude can change a diagnosis from "anorexia: binge-eating type" to bulimia nervosa. It is not unusual for a person with an eating disorder to "move through" various diagnoses as his or her behavior and beliefs change over time.
