= Idiopathic scrotal calcinosis =

Hardening of the scrotum skin

- Other names: Idiopathic calcified nodules of the scrotum
- Specialty: Dermatology

Idiopathic scrotal calcinosis is a cutaneous condition characterized by calcification of the skin resulting from the deposition of calcium and phosphorus occurring on the scrotum. However, the levels of calcium and phosphate in the blood are normal. Idiopathic scrotal calcinosis typically affects young males, with an onset between adolescence and early adulthood. The scrotal calcinosis appears, without any symptoms, as yellowish nodules that range in size from 1 mm to several centimeters.

Without known links to other lesions or systemic pre-conditions, scrotal calcinosis was considered idiopathic. It is not related to calcium phosphate imbalance or renal insufficiency. By 2010, studies supported that epidermoid cysts are believed to be caused by dystrophic calcification. This process involves subclinical inflammation, rupture, calcification, and cyst wall obliteration.

== Presentation ==
The presentation is as follows:

- Single or multiple hard, marble-like nodules of varying size affecting scrotal skin.
- Nodules vary in size from a few millimeters to a few centimeters.
- Usually start to appear in childhood or early adult life
- Over time, nodules increase in number and size
- Nodules may break down and discharge chalky material
- Rarely, lesions may be polypoid
- Usually asymptomatic

== Etiology ==
The cause is not well defined. Originally considered idiopathic condition. Now accepted that majority of cases develop from dystrophic calcification of cyst contents.

== Diagnostic ==
- Clinically Relevant Pathologic Features
- Lesions slowly progress throughout life
  - They slowly increase in number and size
- Nodules are mobile and do not attach to underlying structures

Pathologic Interpretation Pearls

- Globular and granular purple deposits within dermis surrounded by giant cell granulomatous reaction
- Sometimes remnants of cystic lesion can be identified
- Very distinctive appearance with almost no histologic differential diagnosis.

== Treatment ==
Treatment may involve surgery, which is currently the only recommended intervention. Surgery should include the removal of even small nodules, to prevent the recurrence of the scrotal calcinosis.

== Prognosis ==
The prognosis is as follows:

- Benign condition
- Slow progression throughout life
- Lesions remain discrete and do not become confluent

== Epidemiology ==
- Incidence: uncommon
- Age: children and young adults

== History ==
Scrotal calcinosis was first described in 1883 by Lewinski.

== See also ==
- Calcinosis cutis
- Skin lesion
- List of cutaneous conditions
