= IDDM11 =

Insulin-dependent (type I) diabetes mellitus

Insulin-dependent (type I) diabetes mellitus (IDDM) is a genetic heterogenous autoimmune disorder, which is triggered by genetic predisposition and environmental factors. The prevalence of insulin-dependent (type I) diabetes mellitus (IDDM) among children and young adult from Europe is approximately 0.4%. Insulin-dependent (type I) diabetes mellitus (IDDM) is characterized by acute onset and insulin deficiency. Patients with insulin-dependent (type I) diabetes mellitus (IDDM) are found with gradual loss of the pancreatic islet beta cells and therefore not able to produce insulin. As a result, they usually need exogenous insulin to maintain their life.

== Gene location of IDDM ==
Genome-wide linkage analysis could be used for identification in susceptibility genes of insulin-dependent (type I) diabetes mellitus (IDDM). This analysis verifies that eighteen different genome regions are predisposed to insulin-dependent (type I) diabetes mellitus(IDDM). There are 18 different symbols of genome region, which is labeled from IDDM1 to IDDM18. The MHC HLA gene (IDDM1) and the insulin gene INS (IDDM2) are the major genetic candidates in the development of insulin-dependent (type I) diabetes mellitus(IDDM), which are located on the chromosome 6p21.3 and chromosome 11p15 respectively. IDDM3, IDDM4, IDDM5 IDDM7 reside in chromosome 15q26, chromosome 11q13, chromosome 6q25 and 2q31 respectively.IDDM11 (insulin-dependent diabetes mellitus 11) is one of the susceptibility genes for IDDM which locates on chromosome 14q24.3-q31. This loci is identified by linkage to D14S67 marker via a sibling-pair linkage analysis Based on the previous study, the biological behavior of IDDM11is different to HLA region genes so that IDDM11 is less predisposing to HLA. Moreover, IDDM11 has more involvement on the families that are less predisposing to HLA, while IDDM11 has less involvement on the families that are more predisposing to HLA.

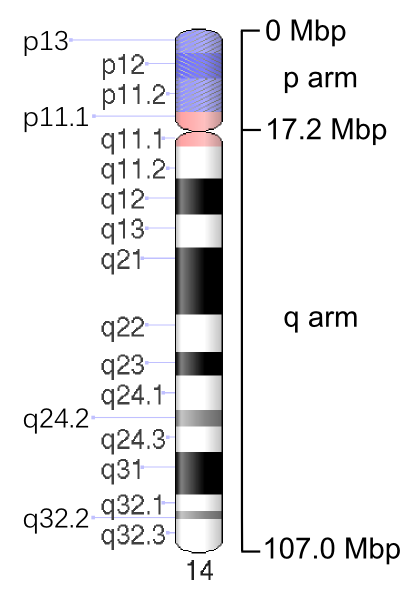
Human chromosome 14 - 550 bphs

The rest of susceptibility genes locus in insulin-dependent (type I) diabetes mellitus (IDDM)are shown in table 1.

Locus	Chrosome	Candidate gene/ Microsatellites
IDDM1	6p21	HLA-DR/ DQ
IDDM2	11p15.5	INS-VNTR
IDDM3	15q26	D15S107
IDDM4	11q13	MDU1, ZFM1, RT6, FADD, LRP5
IDDM5	6q25	ESR, MnSOD
IDDM6	18q12-q21	D18S487, D18S64, JK (Kidd locus)
IDDM7	2q31	D2S152, IL-1, NEUROD, GALNT3, HOXD8
IDDM8	6q25-27	D6S264, D6S446, D6S281
IDDM9	3q21-25	D3S1303, D3S1589, D3S3606
IDDM10	10p11-q11	D10S193, D10S208, D10S588, D10S1426
IDDM11	14q24.3-q31	D14S67
IDDM12	2q33	CTLA-4, CD28
IDDM13	2q34	D2S137, D2S164, IGFBP2, IGFBP5
IDDM14	2q34-q35	NCBI # 3413
IDDM15	6q21	D6S283, D6S434, D6S1580
IDDM16	14q32	IGH
IDDM17	10q25	D10S1750-D10S1773
IDDM18	5q31.1-33.1	IL12B

Table 1 The locus for susceptibility genes for IDDM.

== Gene characteristics of IDDM ==
Most regions of IDDM loci are 1 to 40 cM, which are corresponded to 1 to 40Mb. Each region of IDDM consists several genes.

== Mutations ==
The etiological mutations of all IDDM loci have not been found.

== Controversies ==
SEL1L gene (sel-1 suppressor of Lin-12-like Caenorhabdits elegans) is a negative regulator of the Notch signaling pathway that is responsible for pancreatic endocrine cell development. SEL1L gene is located on chromosome 14q24.3-31. The locus of SEL1L is near to D14S67 marker used for identification of IDDM 11 so that SEL1L gene can serve as a candidate gene for IDDM11. However, the present researchers are object to this thesis. The present researchers use LD (Linkage disequilibrium) analyses and TDT (transmission disequilibrium test) to analyze the SEL1L gene among Danish and Sardinian families. The research result indicates that the SEL1L gene is not supposed to a candidate gene for IDDM11. In addition, other candidate genes for IDDM11 could be tested and identified by using single nucleotide polymorphism (SNP) technology. The following table shows some candidate genes for IDDM11.

Gene
ENSA (endosulfine alpha)
RGS6 (regulator of G-protein signaling 6)
CHES1 (checkpoint suppressor 1)
ESRRB (estrogen-related receptor beta)
KCNK2 (potassium channel,

subfamily K, member 2)

MAP3K9 (mitogen-activated protein kinase 9)
CALM1 (calmodulin 1 phosphorylase

kinase, delta)

NUMB (numb homolog Drosophila)

Table 2 Candidate genes for IDDM11.
