= Cementation =

Cementation may refer to:

- Cementation (biology), the process whereby some sessile bivalve mollusks (and some other shelled invertebrates) attach themselves permanently to a hard substrate
- Cementation (geology), the process of deposition of dissolved mineral components in the interstices of sediments
- Cementation (medical), a small deposit of calcium, similar to a cyst
- Cementation (metallurgy), a process in which ions are reduced to zero valence at a solid metallic interface
- Cementation process, an obsolete technique for making steel by carburization of iron
- Carburization, a process for surface hardening of low-carbon steel
- Cementation Company, a British construction business
