= GalNAc-T activation pathway =

Biological pathway implicated in tumorigenesis

The GalNAc-T activation (GALA) pathway is a cellular process in which GalNAc-T enzymes, involved in O-linked glycosylation, are relocated from the Golgi to the ER. Activation of the pathway is thought to result in the alteration of the glycosylation status of a number of GalNAc-T substrates. This pathway was shown to be highly activated in cancer cells and was proposed as an explanation of the noticeable increased expression of Tn antigen seen in tumours.

== Mechanism ==
The retrograde transport of GalNAc-Ts from the Golgi to the ER is believed to result from the activation of the proto-oncogene tyrosine-protein kinase Src present on the Golgi membrane. This was demonstrated through stimulation of HeLa cells with either EGF or PDGF. Activation of Src triggers the phosphorylation of the GTP exchange factor (GEF) GBF1 hence promoting an interaction between GBF1 and the small GTPase Arf1. Ultimately those Src induced molecular events have been associated with the formation of COPI dependent transport carriers containing GalNAc-Ts and allowing their transport from the Golgi to the ER.

== Clinical significance ==
Activation of the GALA pathway has been tightly associated with ECM degradation. Study of the changes in glycosylation of the GalNAc-T substrate Calnexin-ERp57 has revealed a novel ECM degradative function for this oxidoreductase complex. In fact, GALA activation results in changes in the glycosylation status of Calnexin leading to its relocalization to the cell surface and ultimately promoting this ECM degradation. GALA being highly activated in some cancer cells, Calnexin is logically a promising targetable tumour antigen. In addition, MMP14 is another GalNAc-T substrate for which GALA induced glycosylation changes impact the ECM degradation process.

== History ==
The retro-translocation of GalNAc-Ts from the Golgi to the endoplasmic reticulum was first observed in 2010 by Bard et al. The term GALA was then first used in 2016 by Bard & Chia to designate this molecular pathway. In 2017 the GALA pathway was subject to skepticism from the scientific community due to the inability of Tabak et al. to observe, as previously reported, the relocation of GalNAc-Ts and Tn antigens in HeLa cells upon EGF or PDGF stimulation. However, results supporting the GALA pathway were subsequently re-obtained and critical review of the procedures that failed to support the pathway faded remaining reluctances for the model.
