= GALNT17 =

Protein-coding gene in humans

Identifiers
- Aliases: GALNT17, GALNACT17, GALNT16, GALNT20, GALNTL3, GalNAc-T5L, WBSCR17, Williams-Beuren syndrome chromosome region 17, polypeptide N-acetylgalactosaminyltransferase 17, GalNAc-T17, GalNAc-T19
- External IDs: OMIM: 615137; MGI: 2137594; GeneCards: GALNT17
Enzyme activity
EC #	BRENDA	ExPASy	KEGG	MetaCyc
2.4.1.41	↗	↗	↗	↗

Gene location (Human)
Chr.	Chromosome 7 (human)
Band	7q11.22	Start	71,132,144 bp
Band	7q11.22	End	71,713,600 bp

Gene location (Mouse)
Chr.	Chromosome 5 (mouse)
Band	5|5 G2	Start	130,900,923 bp
Band	5|5 G2	End	131,337,335 bp
RNA expression pattern
Bgee	Human / Mouse (ortholog); Top expressed in: trigeminal ganglion; spinal ganglia; cerebellar vermis; prefrontal cortex; right hemisphere of cerebellum; right frontal lobe; Brodmann area 9; apex of heart; cingulate gyrus; anterior cingulate cortex / Top expressed in: trigeminal ganglion; hippocampus proper; dentate gyrus of hippocampal formation granule cell; spinal ganglia; visual cortex; primary visual cortex; cerebellar cortex; ganglionic eminence; basal forebrain; striatum of neuraxis; More reference expression data
BioGPS	n/a
Gene ontology
Molecular function	metal ion binding; glycosyltransferase activity; carbohydrate binding; polypeptide N-acetylgalactosaminyltransferase activity; transferase activity
Cellular component	Golgi apparatus; Golgi membrane; membrane; integral component of membrane
Biological process	protein glycosylation
Sources:Amigo / QuickGO
Orthologs
Databases	NCBI: entry; OMA: entry
Species	Human	Mouse
Entrez	64409	212996
Ensembl	ENSG00000185274	ENSMUSG00000034040
UniProt	Q6IS24	Q7TT15
RefSeq (mRNA)	NM_022479	NM_145218
RefSeq (protein)	NP_071924	NP_660253
Location (UCSC)	Chr 7: 71.13 – 71.71 Mb	Chr 5: 130.9 – 131.34 Mb
PubMed search
- Wikidata
View/Edit Human	View/Edit Mouse

Polypeptide N-acetylgalactosaminyltransferase 17 is an enzyme that in humans is encoded by the WBSCR17 gene.

This gene encodes a N-acetylgalactosaminyltransferase, which has 97% sequence identity to the mouse protein. This gene is deleted in Williams syndrome, a multisystem developmental disorder caused by the deletion of contiguous genes at 7q11.23.
