= Calcinosis =

Formation of calcium deposits in soft tissue

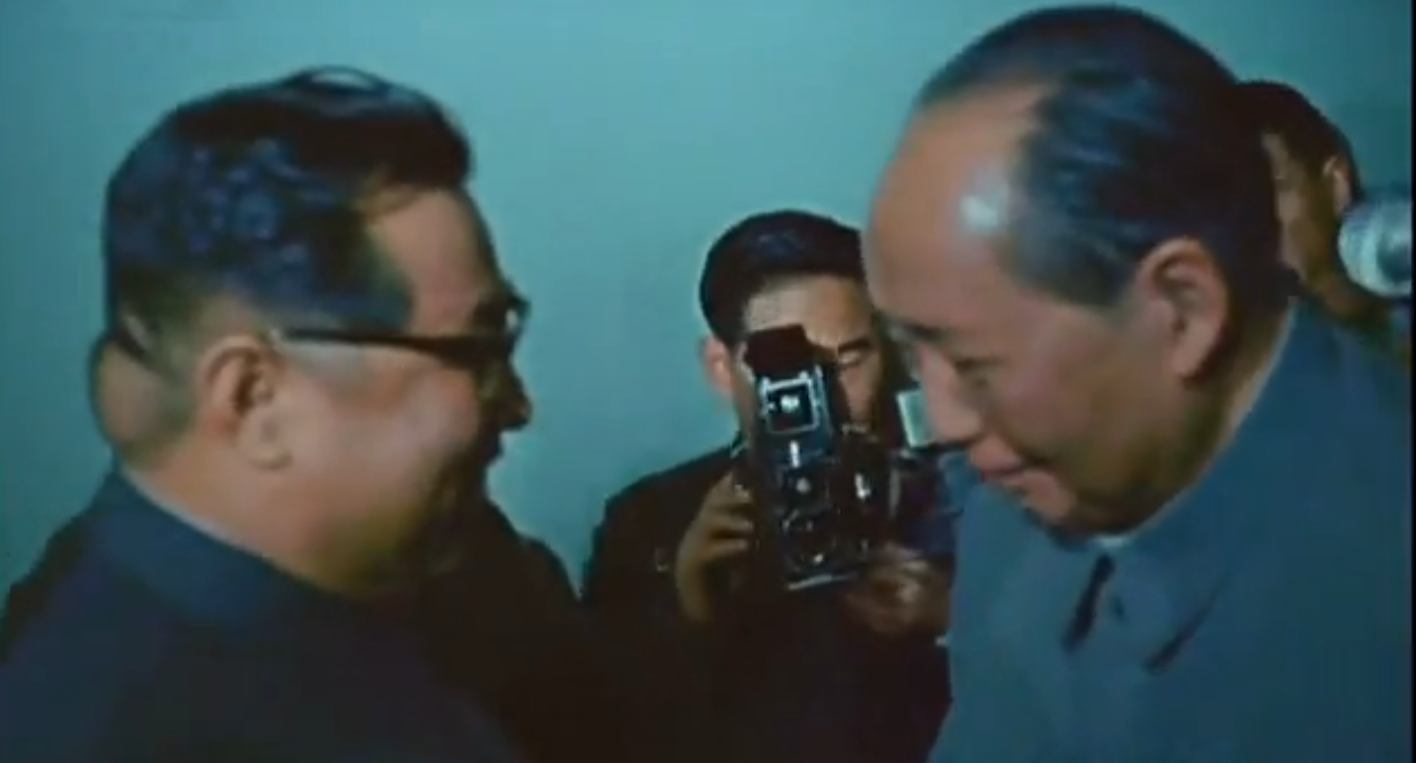
- North Korean President Kim Il Sung's calcium deposit is noticeable on the back of his head in this rare newsreel still image during a diplomatic meeting between him and Chinese leader Mao Zedong in Beijing, 1970.
- Specialty: Endocrinology

Calcinosis is the formation of calcium deposits in any soft tissue. It is a rare condition that has many different causes. These range from infection and injury to systemic diseases like kidney failure.

== Types ==
=== Dystrophic calcification ===
The most common type of calcinosis is dystrophic calcification. This type of calcification can occur as a response to any soft tissue damage, including that involved in implantation of medical devices.

=== Metastatic calcification ===
Metastatic calcification involves a systemic calcium excess imbalance, which can be caused by hypercalcemia, kidney failure, milk-alkali syndrome, lack or excess of other minerals, or other causes.

=== Tumoral calcinosis ===
The cause of the rare condition of tumoral calcinosis is not entirely understood. It is generally characterized by large, globular calcifications near joints.

== See also ==
- Calcification
- Calcinosis cutis
- Dermatomyositis
- Fahr's syndrome
- Hyperphosphatemia
- Primrose syndrome
- Scleroderma
