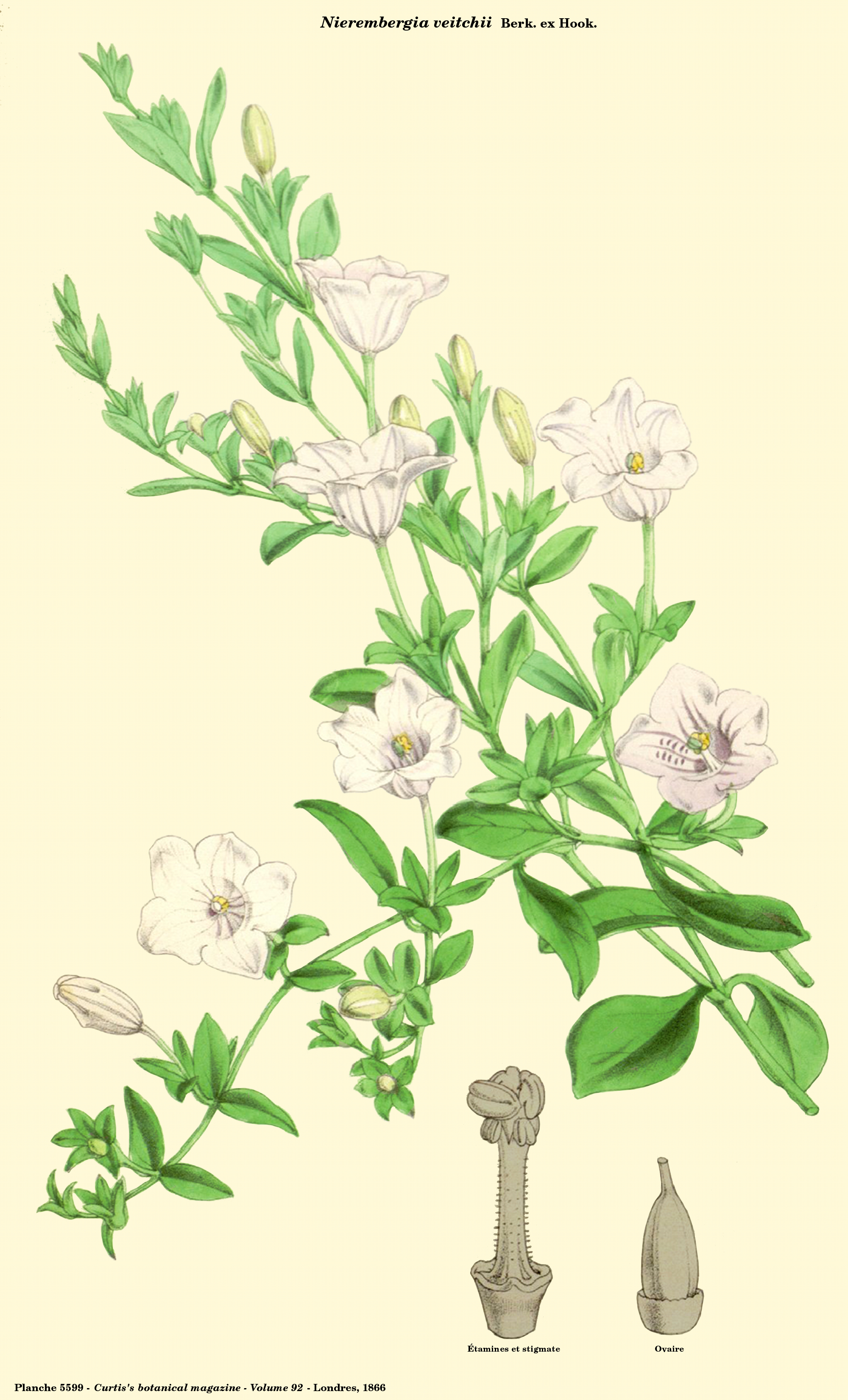

Scientific classification
- Kingdom: Plantae
- Clade: Tracheophytes
- Clade: Angiosperms
- Clade: Eudicots
- Clade: Asterids
- Order: Solanales
- Family: Solanaceae
- Genus: Nierembergia
- Species: N. veitchii

Binomial name
- Nierembergia veitchii Berk. ex Hook.

= Nierembergia veitchii =

Species of plant

Nierembergia veitchii is a species of plant in the family Solanaceae. The species is commonly called the trailing cup plant.

The species is found in north eastern parts of Argentina.

The plant can cause rapid hypercalcemia and widespread metastatic calcification.
