= Calcification =

Accumulation of calcium salts in bodily tissue, usually bone

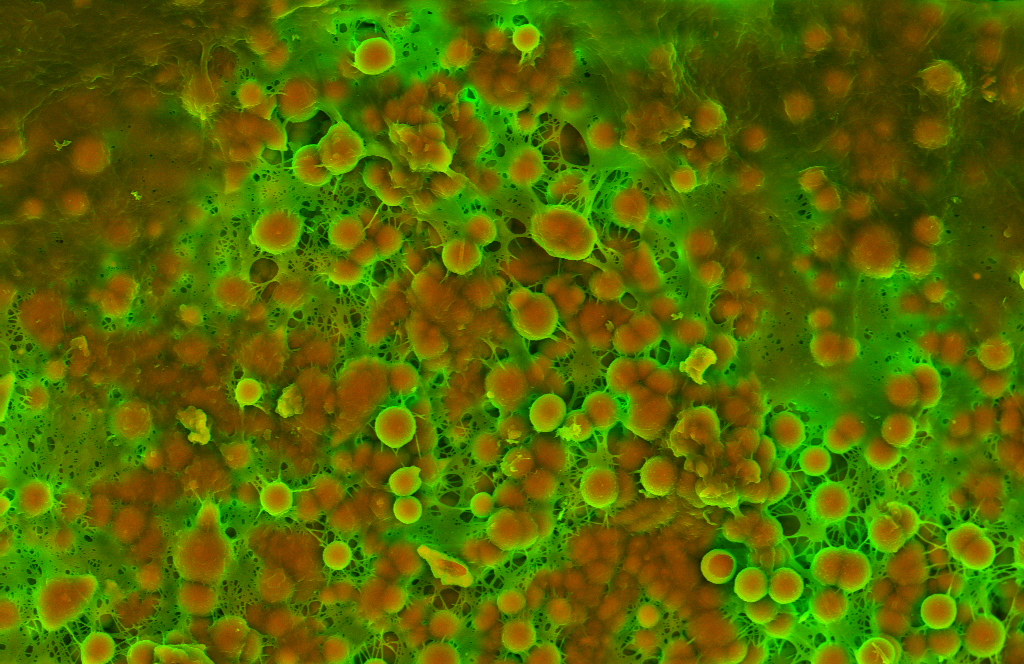
Density-Dependent Colour Scanning Electron Micrograph SEM (DDC-SEM) of cardiovascular calcification, showing in orange calcium phosphate spherical particles (denser material) and, in green, the extracellular matrix (less dense material).

Calcification is the accumulation of calcium salts in a body tissue. It normally occurs in the formation of bone, but calcium can be deposited abnormally in soft tissue, causing it to harden. Calcifications may be classified on whether there is mineral balance or not, and the location of the calcification. Calcification may also refer to the processes of normal mineral deposition in biological systems, such as the formation of stromatolites or mollusc shells.

== Signs and symptoms ==
Calcification can manifest itself in many ways in the body depending on the location.

In the pulpal structure of a tooth, calcification often presents asymptomatically, and is diagnosed as an incidental finding during radiographic interpretation. Individual teeth with calcified pulp will typically respond negatively to vitality testing; teeth with calcified pulp often lack sensation of pain, pressure, and temperature.

== Causes of soft tissue calcification ==
Calcification of soft tissue (arteries, cartilage, heart valves, etc.) can be caused by vitamin K_{2} deficiency or by poor calcium absorption due to a high calcium/vitamin D ratio. This can occur with or without a mineral imbalance.

A common misconception is that calcification is caused by excess amount of calcium in diet. Dietary calcium intake is not associated with accumulation of calcium in soft tissue, and calcification occurs irrespective of the amount of calcium intake.

Intake of excessive vitamin D can cause vitamin D poisoning and excessive intake of calcium from the intestine which, when accompanied by a deficiency of vitamin K (perhaps induced by an anticoagulant), can result in calcification of arteries and other soft tissue. Such metastatic soft tissue calcification is mainly in tissues containing "calcium catchers" such as elastic fibres or mucopolysaccharides. These tissues especially include the lungs (pumice lung) and the aorta.

=== Mineral balance ===
- Dystrophic calcification, without a systemic mineral imbalance.
- Metastatic calcification, a systemic elevation of calcium levels in the blood and all tissues.

== Forms ==
Calcification can be pathological or a standard part of the aging process. Nearly all adults show calcification of the pineal gland.

=== Location ===
- Extraskeletal calcification, e.g. calciphylaxis
- Brain, e.g. primary familial brain calcification (Fahr's syndrome)
  - Choroid plexus usually in the lateral ventricles
- Tumor calcification
- Arthritic bone spurs
- Kidney stones
- Gall stones
- Heterotopic bone
- Tonsil stones
- Pulp stone

=== Breast disease ===
In a number of breast pathologies, calcium is often deposited at sites of cell death or in association secretions or hyalinized stroma, resulting in pathologic calcification. For example, small, irregular, linear calcifications may be seen, via mammography, in a ductal carcinoma-in-situ to produce visible radio-opacities.

=== Arteriosclerotic calcification ===
One of the principal causes of arterial stiffening with age is vascular calcification. Vascular calcification is the deposition of mineral in the form of calcium phosphate salts in the smooth muscle-rich medial layer of large arteries including the aorta. DNA damage, especially oxidative DNA damage, causes accelerated vascular calcification. Vascular calcification could also be linked to the chronic leakage of blood lysates into the vessel wall since red blood cells have been shown to contain a high concentration of calcium.

== Diagnosis ==
In terms of diagnosis, in this case vascular calcification, an ultrasound and radiography of said area is sufficient.

== Treatment ==
Treatment of high calcium/vitamin D ratio may most easily be accomplished by intake of more vitamin D if vitamin K is normal. Intake of too much vitamin D would be evident by anorexia, loss of appetite, or soft tissue calcification.

== See also ==
- Calcinosis
- In vitro models for calcification
- Marine biogenic calcification
- Monckeberg's arteriosclerosis
- Petrifaction/petrification
- Pineal gland
