= In vitro models for calcification =

In vitro models for calcification may refer to systems that have been developed in order to reproduce, in the best possible way, the calcification process that tissues or biomaterials undergo inside the body. The aim of these systems is to mimic the high levels of calcium and phosphate present in the blood and measure the extent of the crystal's deposition. Different variations can include other parameters to increase the veracity of these models, such as flow, pressure, compliance and resistance. All the systems have different limitations that have to be acknowledged regarding the operating conditions and the degree of representation. The rational of using such is to partially replace in vivo animal testing, whilst rendering much more controllable and independent parameters compared to an animal model.

The main use of these models is to study the calcification potential of prostheses that are in direct contact with the blood. In this category we find examples such as animal tissue prostheses (xenogeneic bioprosthesis). Xenogeneic heart valves are of special importance for this area of study as they demonstrate a limited durability mainly due to the fatigue of the tissue and the calcific deposits (see Aortic valve replacement).

== Description ==
In vitro calcification models have been used in medical implant development to evaluate the calcification potential of the medical device or tissue. They can be considered a subfamily of the bioreactors that have been used in the field of tissue engineering for tissue culture and growth. These calcification bioreactors are designed to mimic and maintain the mechano-chemical environment that the tissue encounters in vivo with a view to generating the pathological environment that would favor calcium deposition. Parameters including medium flow, pH, temperature and supersaturation of the calcifying solution used in the bioreactor are maintained and closely monitored. The monitoring of these parameters allows to obtain information about the calcification potential of the medical device or tissue. In vitro calcification models can be categorized according to the level of representation of the physiological conditions, as static culture, constant supersaturation, and dynamic models.

== Models ==
=== Static Culture ===
The simplest in vitro model for calcification is the static culture method. This method uses cell culture media enriched with different ions found in the blood plasma, such as calcium and phosphate, to produce a calcification effect on the cells. This model, which simulates physiological temperature and pH, has been used to study living tissues. However, a major drawback is the lack of regulation regarding the levels of calcium and phosphate as it occurs in the human body (see Metabolism, Minerals and cofactors).

=== Constant Supersaturation Bioreactor ===
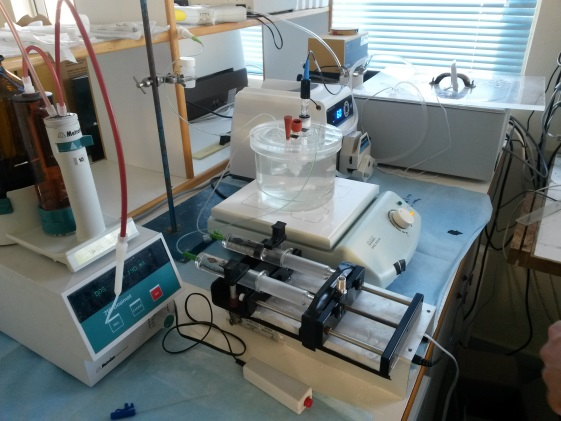
Constant supersaturation reactor for the study of hydroxyapatite crystal growth (Laboratory of Biomechanics and Biomedical Engineering, University of Patras, Greece).

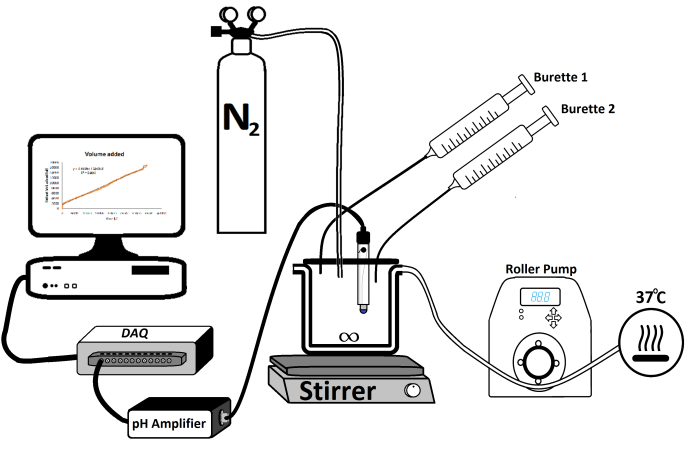
Schematic representation of the constant supersaturation reactor.

The "constant supersaturation method" also known as "constant composition", is based in the consumption and successive replacement of the ions that are deposited to form apatitic structures onto the tissue under evaluation. The strategy of this model is to reproduce the chemical environment present in the body with solutions high in calcium and phosphate concentrations. The model incorporates a bioreactor vessel, a controlling mechanism and a set of burettes that replace the ions deposited during the calcific process. The kinetics of the reaction is monitored by the measurement of pH, which is proportional to the deprotonation of the acid phosphate via hydrolysis.

The pH change drives the addition of titrants in the system that replaces the amount of calcium and phosphate deposited onto the tissue and at the same time maintains the ionic strength of the solution constant, usually kept close to the physiological level at 0.15M. The volume of titrants added to maintain the pH is proportional to the quantity of crystallization sites and the supersaturation degree of the solution. The titrant addition rate will determine the mass deposition of crystals onto the tissue.

This model does not provide the flow or the mechanical stimuli to the tissue. Both flow and mechanical stimuli affect the course and sites of calcium deposition.

=== Dynamic Calcification Models ===
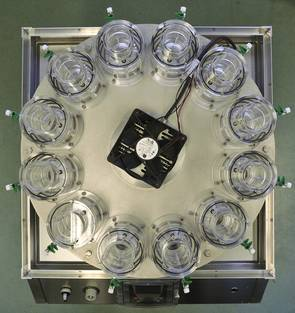
Fatigue tester of bioprosthetic heart valves (AME, Helmholtz Institute of RWTH Aachen University & Hospital).

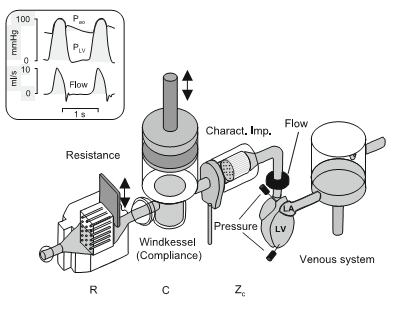
Example of a systemic circuit simulator with a three-element Windkessel

Dynamic calcification models employ a mock circulation to provide the chemical conditions for calcification, whilst at the same time subject the construct to a mechanical stimulation. This stimulation tries to mimic the mechanical environment encountered in vivo. These models can combine the constant supersaturation principle together with pulsatile flow, which is characteristic of the human cardiovascular system. The calcification solution used in such models is similar to the one used in the constant supersaturation reactor.

The concept of dynamic calcification models was first introduced after it was realized that the mechanical stresses affected the tissue calcification, especially in the case of heart valves. The dynamic calcification systems aim at recreating the stresses and strains that tissues experience in vivo and combining them with an environment that enhances calcification.

These systems incorporate flowmeters, pressure transducers and temperature sensors to closely monitor the simulated conditions. In these models, the kinetics of calcification remains the same as in the case of the static systems but the introduction of mechanical stimulation may affect the sites and extent of the deposition.

Dynamic models can vary in terms of the means of providing the flow in the system, as well as in terms of the dynamic stimulation rate. Accelerated frequencies are employed with a view to simulating longer equivalent in vivo durations. Accelerated models can provide long term calcification predictions but bearing in mind that the mechanical and flow stresses might be extra-physiological.

== Limitations ==
The gold standard for calcification experiments is the in vivo model. However, it is morally debatable and it is difficult to control and monitor the parameters under evaluation. Furthermore, the cost of an in vivo experience is much more elevated than the in vitro models.

Several models can simulate the in vivo situation with certain degree of representation. Static cultures can be of great help to study living tissues but they are not suitable to keep the levels of calcium and phosphate constant as in the human body. Constant supersaturation systems fulfill this requirement but they are not suitable for living tissues. Finally, dynamic models add a mechanical stimulation not present in the other models. The dynamic models can apply physiological or extra-physiological stimulation to the device or tissue being tested (for the case of accelerated systems) but they share the same disadvantages with the constant supersaturation bioreactors.

In vitro vs In vivo comparison
In vivo	In vitro			
	Static Cultures	Constant supersaturation systems	Dynamic systems	Accelerated systems
Advantages
Accurate and free of environmental effects	Easy to achieve	Easy to control and to obtain data	Same as CSR (Note: Constant Supersaturation Reactor)	Same as CSR
Include the immunological and cellular component of the response as well as the mineral metabolism mechanisms that collaborate in the calcification process	Easily reproducible conditions	Short time experiments	Same as CSR	Same as CSR
Include the immunological and cellular component of the response as well as the mineral metabolism mechanisms that collaborate in the calcification process	Short term experiments	Independent and controllable parameters	Same as CSR	Reduces the experimentation times
Include the immunological and cellular component of the response as well as the mineral metabolism mechanisms that collaborate in the calcification process	Low cost	Independent and controllable parameters	Replicates the blood flow mechanics	Reduces the experimentation times
Include the immunological and cellular component of the response as well as the mineral metabolism mechanisms that collaborate in the calcification process	Can study the living cells mechanism	Easy to reproduce	Replicates the blood flow mechanics	Replicates the fatigue in the tissue
They are the closest to a human model that can be achieved	Can study the living cells mechanism	Easy to reproduce	Replicates the blood flow mechanics	Replicates the fatigue in the tissue
Disadvantages
Expensive	Not possible to maintain a constant level of calcium phosphate	Does not reproduce the blood flow mechanics	Same as CSR	Same as CSR
Morally debatable	Not possible to maintain a constant level of calcium phosphate	Does not reproduce the blood flow mechanics	Same as CSR	The supraphysiological conditions might affect the tissue or material's structure in a non representative fashion
Lack of real time monitoring	Does not represent the mineral levels nor the mechanical parameters present in vivo	Does not represent correctly the cellular or immunological response	Same as CSR	The supraphysiological conditions might affect the tissue or material's structure in a non representative fashion
Calcification takes long period of times	Does not represent the mineral levels nor the mechanical parameters present in vivo	Does not represent correctly the cellular or immunological response	Same as CSR	The supraphysiological conditions might affect the tissue or material's structure in a non representative fashion
