= Juan Eusebio Nieremberg =

Spanish Jesuit, polymath and mystic (1595–1658)

Juan Eusebio Nieremberg SJ
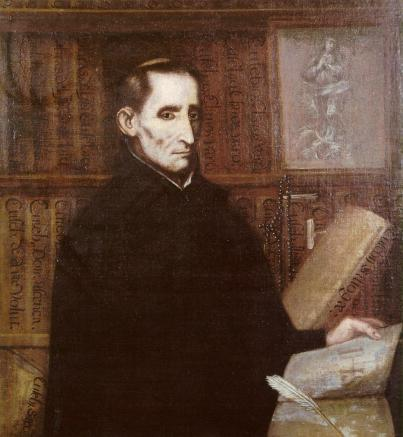
- Juan Eusebio Nieremberg
- Born: September 9, 1595; Madrid, Spain
- Died: April 7, 1658 (aged 62); Madrid, Spain
- Education: University of Alcalá
- Parent(s): Gottfried Nieremberg and Regina Nieremberg (née Ottin)
- Scientific career
- Fields: Natural history
- Workplaces: Colegio Imperial de Madrid

Juan Eusebio Nieremberg y Ottín SJ (9 September de 1595 – 7 April 1658) was a Spanish Jesuit, polymath and mystic.

== Biography ==
Nieremberg was born in Madrid to German parents. His father was a Tyrolese, and his mother a Bavarian. He studied the classics at the Royal Court, science at Alcalá and canon law at Salamanca.

He joined the Society of Jesus (Jesuits) in 1614, much against the wishes of his father who finally obliged him to leave the novitiate of Villagarcía. He remained firm in his resolution and was permitted to return to Madrid to finish his probation.

He studied Greek and Hebrew at the Colegio de Huete, arts and theology at Alcalá, and was ordained in 1623, making his profession in 1633. At the Colegio Imperial de Madrid he taught humanities and natural history for sixteen years and Sacred Scripture for three. As a director of souls he was much sought, being appointed by royal command confessor to the Duchess of Mantua, granddaughter of Philip II. Remarkable for his exemplary life, he was an indefatigable worker, and one of the most prolific writers of his time.

Seventy-three printed and eleven manuscript works are attributed to him, of these twenty-four at least are in Latin. His works are distinguished for their erudition, those in Spanish being characterized according to Capmany, by nobility and purity of diction, terse, well-knit phrases, forcible metaphors, and vivid imagery. The Spanish Academy includes his name in the "Diccionario de Autoridades".

He was highly esteemed in devout circles as the author of De la afición y amor de Jesus (1630), and De la afición y amor de María (1630), both of which were translated into Arabic, Dutch, French, German, Italian and Latin. These works, together with the Prodigios del amor divino (1641), are now forgotten, but Nieremberg's version (1656) of the Imitation is still a favorite, and his eloquent treatise, De la hermosura de Dios y su amabilidad (1649), is the last classical manifestation of mysticism in Spanish literature.

Nieremberg published several books on natural history in which traditional Aristotelian conceptions tended to be replaced by a neoplatonic approach to nature. He was keenly interested in new animal and plant species from America and consulted many manuscript sources coming from across the Atlantic, including Francisco Hernández’s unpublished works on Mexican medicinal plants.

== Works ==
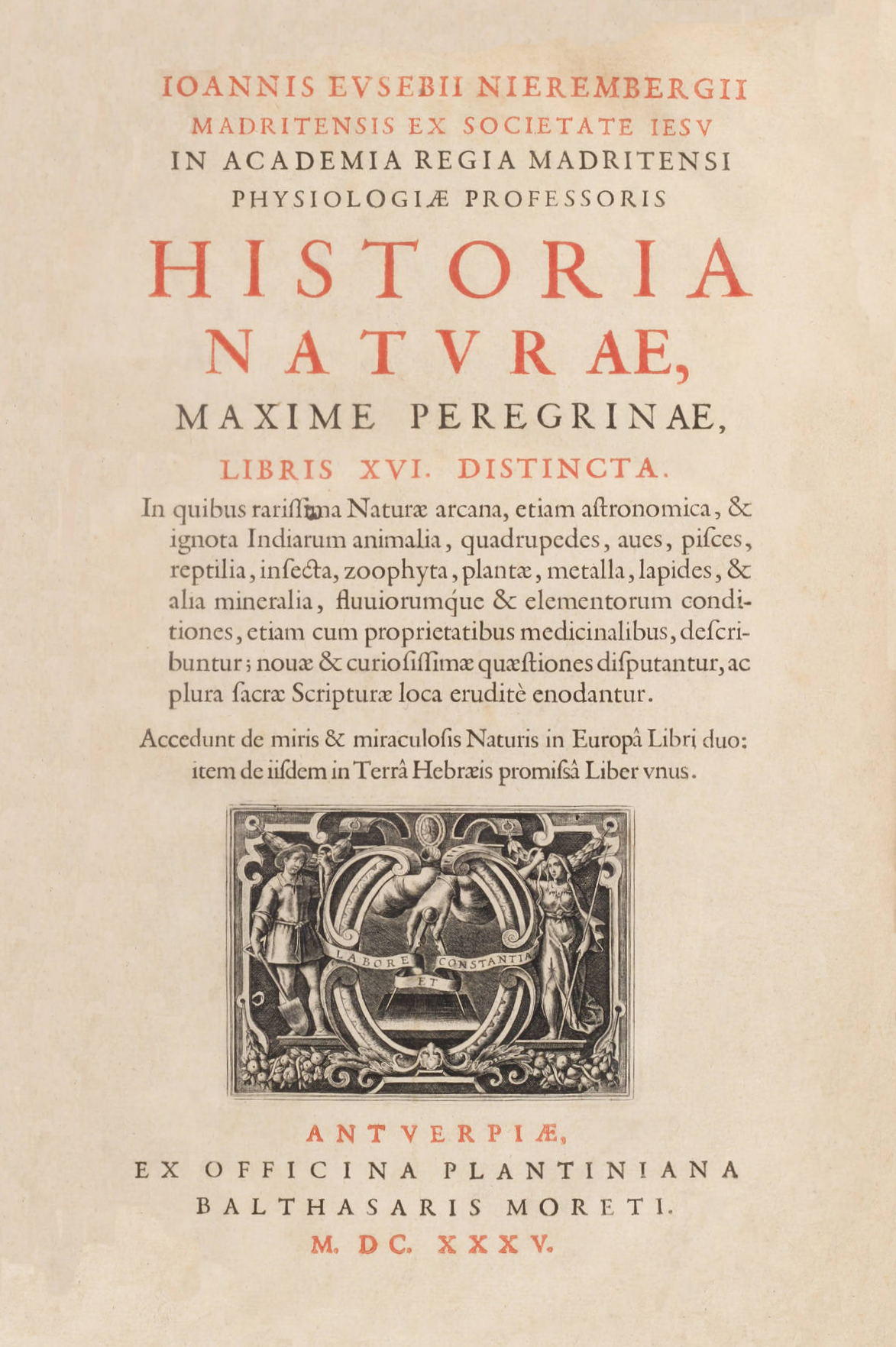
Historia natvrae, maxime peregrinae (libris XVI). 1635.

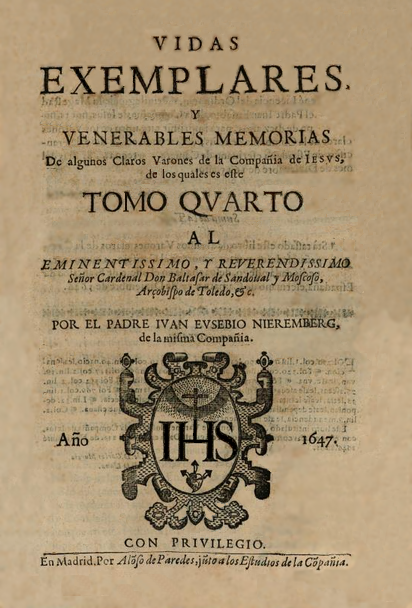
Vidas ejemplares y venerables memorias de algunos claros varones de la Compañía de Jesús (tomo cuarto). 1647.

- Obras y Días. Manual de Señores y Principes; en que se Propone con su Pureza y Rigor la Especulación y Ejecución Política, Económica y Particular de Todas las Virtudes (Madrid, 1628)
- Centuria de dictámenes prudentes (Quiñones, Madrid, 1641).
- Prolusión a la doctrina e historia natural (Madrid, 1629).
- Sigalion sive de sapientia mythica (Madrid, 1629; Lyon, 1642)
- Curiosa Filosofía y cuestiones naturales (Imprenta del Reino, Madrid, 1630)
- Vida del glorioso Patriarca San Ignacio de Loyola (Madrid, 1631)
- De adoratione in spiritu et veritate (Amberes, 1631)
- De arte voluntatis (Lyon, 1631)
- De la afición y amor de Jesús, (1630?; Madrid, 1632)
- De la afición y amor de María... (1630?; Madrid, 1632)
- Vida Divina y Camino Real de Grande Atajo para la Perfección (Madrid, 1633; 1633)
- Historia naturae, maxime peregrinae (in Latin). Antwerp: Officina Plantiniana. 1635.
- Oculta Filosofía, (Barcelona, 1645)
- Curiosa y oculta filosofia: primera y segunda parte de las marauillas de la naturaleza, examinadas en varias questiones naturales... Tercera impression añadida por el mismo autor (Alcalá: Imprenta de María Fernández, a costa de Juan Antonio Bonet, 1649).
- Libro de la vida de Jesús crucificado, impreso en Jerusalén con su sangre (Barcelona, 1634)
- Trophaea mariana seu de victrice misericordia Deiparae, gefolgt von De virginitate S.S. Dei Matris apologetica dissertatio (Amberes, 1638)
- Del aprecio y estima de la gracia divina, que nos mereció el Hijo de Dios, con su Preciosa Sangre, y Pasión (Juan Sánchez, Madrid, 1638; Hospital Real y General, Zaragoza, 1640)
- Compendio de la vida del V.P. Martin Gutiérrez (Madrid, 1639)
- De la diferencia entre lo temporal y lo eterno, y Crisol de Desengaños (Madrid, 1640, 1654; Imprenta Real, Madrid, 1675)
- Práctica del Catecismo romano y doctrina cristiana (Diego Díaz de la Carrera, Madrid 1640, 1641; Imp. María de Quiñones, Madrid, 1646)
- Vida del dichoso y venerable Padre Marcelo Francisco Mastrilli (Madrid, 1640)
- Flores espirituales en que se proponen varios puntos muy provechosos para las almas (Madrid, 1640)
- Prodigio del amor divino y finezas de Dios con los hombres (Juan Sánchez, Madrid, 1641).
- De la hermosura de Dios y su amabilidad por las Infinitas Perfecciones del Ser Divino (Juan Sánchez, Madrid 1641)
- Theopoliticus sive brevis illucidatio et rationale divinorum operum atque providentia humanorum (Amberes, 1641)
- Causa y remedio de los males públicos (Francisco de Robles, Madrid, 1642)
- Consuelo de las almas escrupulosas y su remedio, (Madrid, 1642).
- Dictámenes de espíritu (Puebla de Los Ángeles, 1642)
- Tratado sobre el lugar de los Cantares Veni de Libano Explicado de la perfección religiosa (Madrid: Francisco Maroto a costa de Francisco de Robles, mercader de libros, 1642)
- Ideas de virtud en algunos claros varones de la Compañía de Jesús, para los Religiosos de Ella (in Spanish). Madrid: María de Quiñones. 1643.
- Doctrinae asceticae sive spiritualium institutionum pandectae (Lyon, 1643)
- Partida a la eternidad y preparación para la muerte, (Madrid, 1643)
- De la devoción y patrocinio de San Miguel (María de Quiñones, Madrid, 1643)
- Corona virtuosa y virtud coronada (Francisco Maroto, Madrid, 1643)
- Del nuevo misterio de la piedra imßn y nueva descripción del globo terrestre (Madrid, 1643)
- Firmamento religioso de lucidos astros en algunos claros varones de la Compañía de Jesús (in Spanish). Madrid: Quiñones. 1644.
- Honor del gran patriarca S. Ignacio de Loyola, fundador de la Compañía de Jesús, en que se Propone su Vida, y la de su Discípulo el Apóstol de las Indias S. Francisco Xavier. Con la Milagrosa Historia del Admirable Padre Marcelo Mastrilli, y las Noticias de Gran Multitud de Hijos del Mismo P. Ignacio, Varones Clarísimos en Santidad, Doctrina, Trabajos, y Obras Maravillosas en Servicio de la Iglesia (in Spanish). Madrid: Quiñones. 1645.
- Vida del Santo Padre Francisco de Borja (in Spanish). Madrid: Maria de Quiñones. 1644.
- Partida a la eternidad y preparación a la muerte (Imprenta Real, Madrid, 1645)
- Vidas ejemplares y venerables memorias de algunos claros varones de la Compañía de Jesús, de los Cuales es este Tomo Cuarto (in Spanish). Madrid: Alonso de Paredes. 1647.
- De la constancia en la virtud y medios de perseverencia (Madrid, 1647)
- Epistolas del reverendo Padre Juan Eusebio Nieremberg, Religioso de la Compañía de Jesús. Publicadas pour Manuel de Faria y Sousa, Caballero de la Orden de Cristo, y de la Casa Real (por Alonso de Paredes, Madrid, 1649)
- Devocionario del santísimo Sacramento (Madrid, 1649).
- Cielo estrellado de María (Madrid, 1655)
- Obras cristianas del Padre Juan Eusebio Nieremberg, Tomo I de sus obras en romance (Imprenta Real, Madrid, 1665)
- Obras filosóficas del Padre Juan Eusebio Nieremberg, Tomo III (Imprenta Real, Madrid, 1664)
- Obras cristianas (Lucas Martín de Hermosilla, Sevilla, 1686)
- Vida de Santa Teresa de Jesús (Madrid, 1882)

== Eponymy ==
The Spanish botanists Ruiz and Pavón (Hipólito Ruiz López and Jose Antonio Pavón y Jimenez) named an attractive plant in the tobacco family, Nierembergia, after him in their Flora Peruvianae, et Chilensis Prodromus (1794).

== Bibliography ==
- Andrade, Alonso de (1660). "Vida del muy espiritual y erudito Padre J. E. Nieremberg". Varones Ilustres de la Compañía de Jesús. Vol. VIII. Madrid: Alonso de Paredes. pp. 1–57.
- Olivares Zorrilla, Rocío (2009). "Juan Eusebio Nieremberg y Sor Juana Inés de la Cruz". Doctrina y diversión en la cultura española y novohispana. Madrid: Iberoamericana. pp. 149–165. ISBN 978-8484894025.
- Boumediene, Samir (2020). "Jesuit recipes, Jesuit receipts: the Society of Jesus and the introduction of exotic materia medica into Europe". In Linda A. Newson (ed.). Cultural Worlds of the Jesuits in Colonial Latin America. London: University of London Press. pp. 229–254. JSTOR j.ctvwrm4h1.16.
