= Nierembergia espinosae =

Conservation status
- Endangered (IUCN 3.1)

Scientific classification
- Kingdom: Plantae
- Clade: Tracheophytes
- Clade: Angiosperms
- Clade: Eudicots
- Clade: Asterids
- Order: Solanales
- Family: Solanaceae
- Genus: Nierembergia
- Species: N. espinosae

Binomial name
- Nierembergia espinosae Steyerm.

Species of flowering plant

Nierembergia espinosae is a species of plant in the family Solanaceae. It is endemic to Ecuador.
