= Tumoral calcinosis =

Formation of calcium deposits in the soft tissue around joints

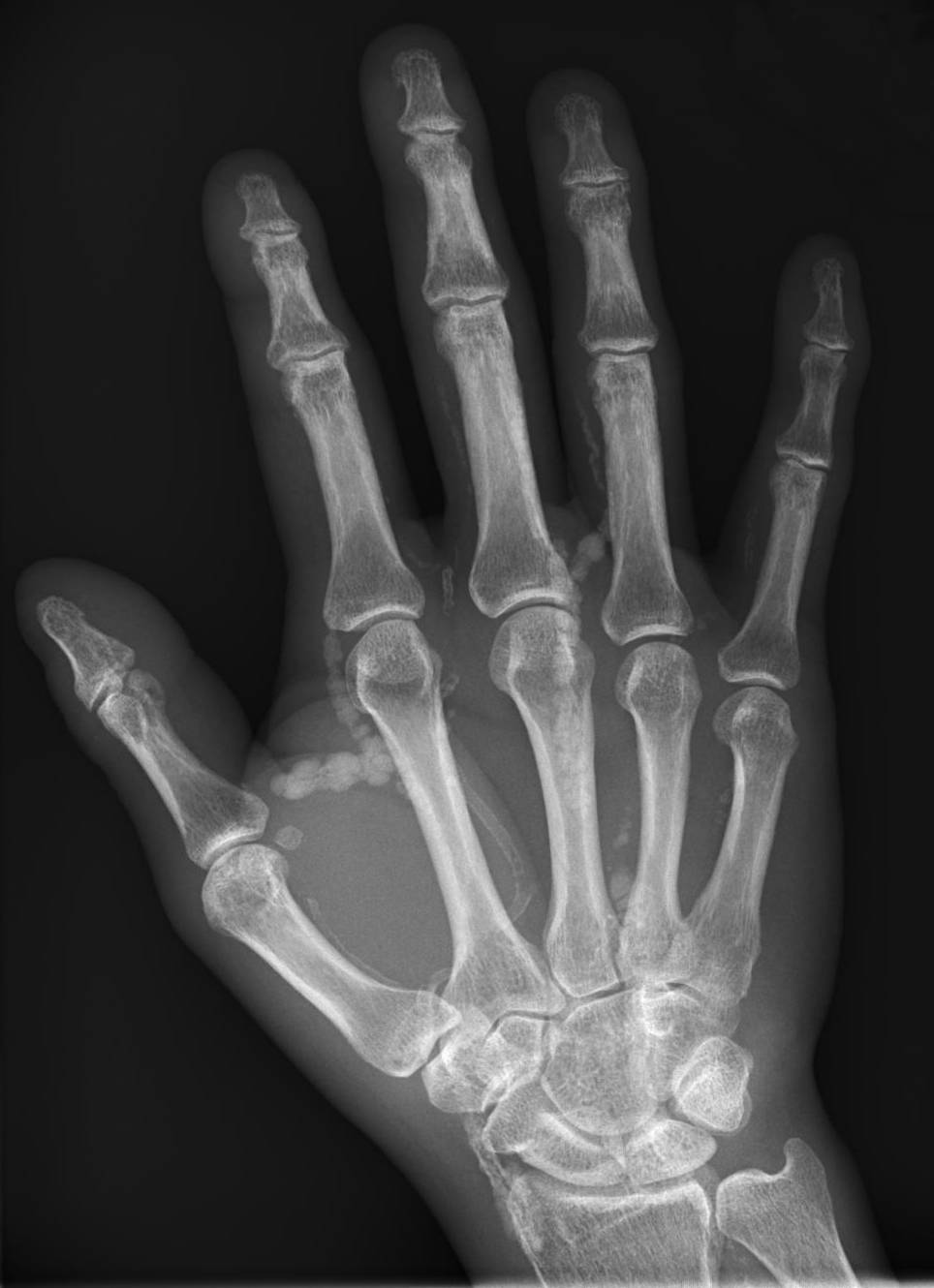
- Hand radiograph showing tumoral calcinosis, PA radiograph of the right hand showing tumoral calcinosis-like metastatic calcification in a patient on dialysis. Dialysis alters calcium phosphate product (>70). Idiopathic tumoral calcinosis is autosomal dominant and is not associated with dialysis. Note the premature arterial calcification which is a clue that this is a renal patient. Vascular calcification contributes to an increase in morbidity.
- Specialty: Endocrinology

Tumoral calcinosis is a rare condition in which there is calcium deposition in the soft tissue in periarticular location, around joints, outside the joint capsule. They are frequently (0.5–3%) seen in patients undergoing renal dialysis. Clinically also known as hyperphosphatemic familial tumoral calcinosis (HFTC), is often caused by genetic mutations in genes that regulate phosphate physiology in the body (leading to too much phosphate (hyperphosphatemia)). Best described genes that harbour mutations in humans are FGF-23, Klotho (KL), or GALNT3. A zebrafish animal model with reduced GALNT3 expression also showed HFTC-like phenotype, indicating an evolutionary conserved mechanism that is involved in developing tumoral calcinosis.

== Clinical features ==
The name indicates calcinosis (calcium deposition) which resembles tumor (like a new growth). They are not true neoplasms – they don't have dividing cells. They are just deposition of inorganic calcium with serum exudate. Children and adolescents (6 to 25 years) are the most commonly affected. The symptom that the accumulations cause is not pain but swelling around joints. They have propensity to enlarge progressively and ulcerate the overlying skin and extrude. They are most common around shoulders, hips and elbows. Laboratory evaluation reveal normal serum calcium levels and hyperphosphatemia. Rarely ALP (alkaline phosphatase – an enzyme active at sites of bone formation) may be elevated. Treatment is normalization of serum phosphate levels and resection of lesions. Surgical removal should be complete and if part of it is left, recurrence is likely to occur. Cutting through the excised calcium deposition reveals semifluid calcium suspension in albumin encapsulated by fibrous tissue.

== Additional images ==
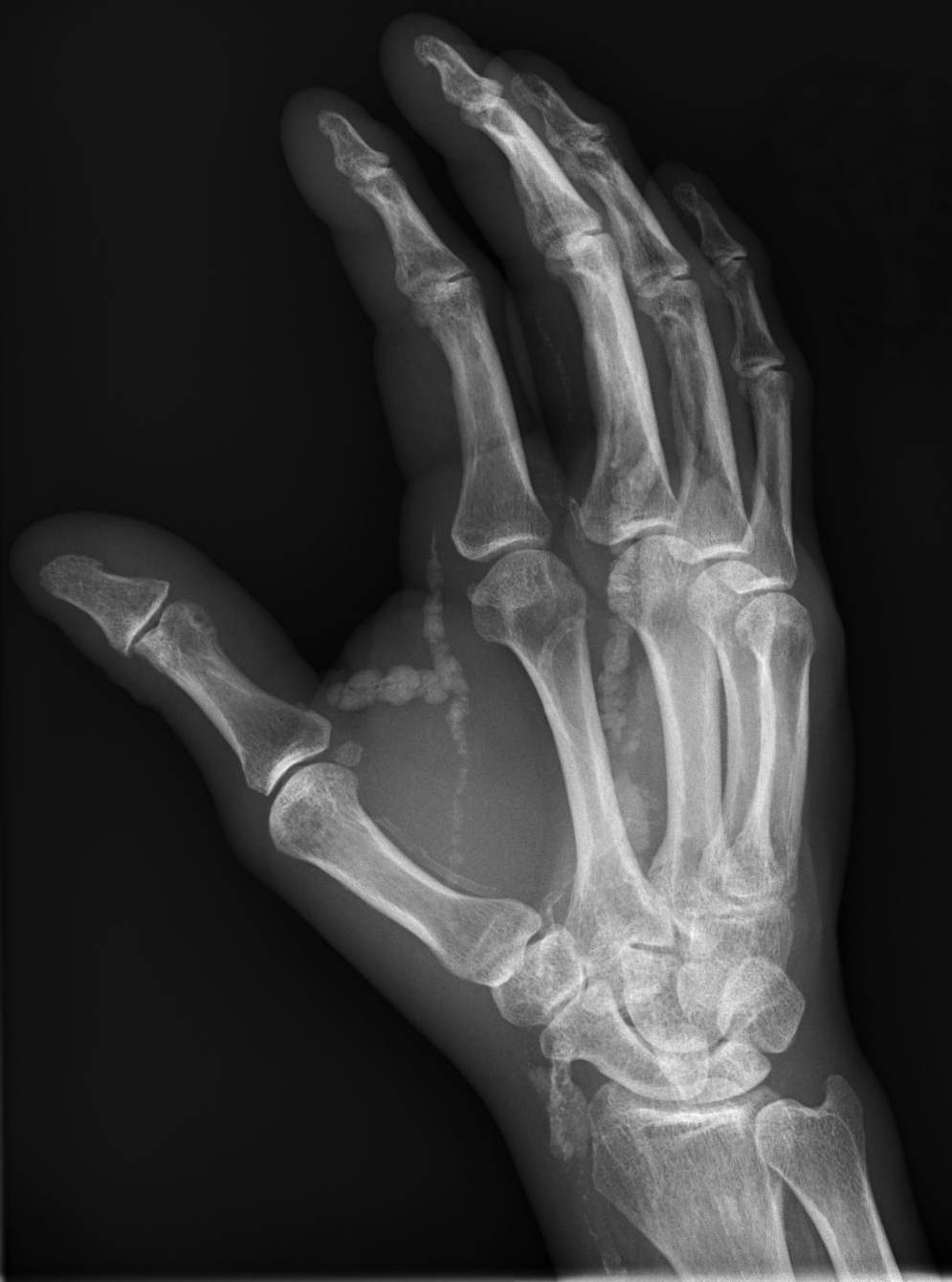
Oblique radiograph of the right hand demonstrating soft tissue calcification, characteristic of dialysis related metastatic calcification.

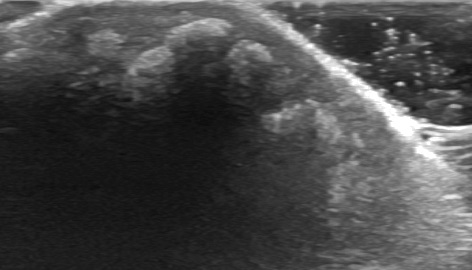
tumorous calcinosis over a malleolus in ultrasound
