= Osteoma cutis =

- Other names: POH
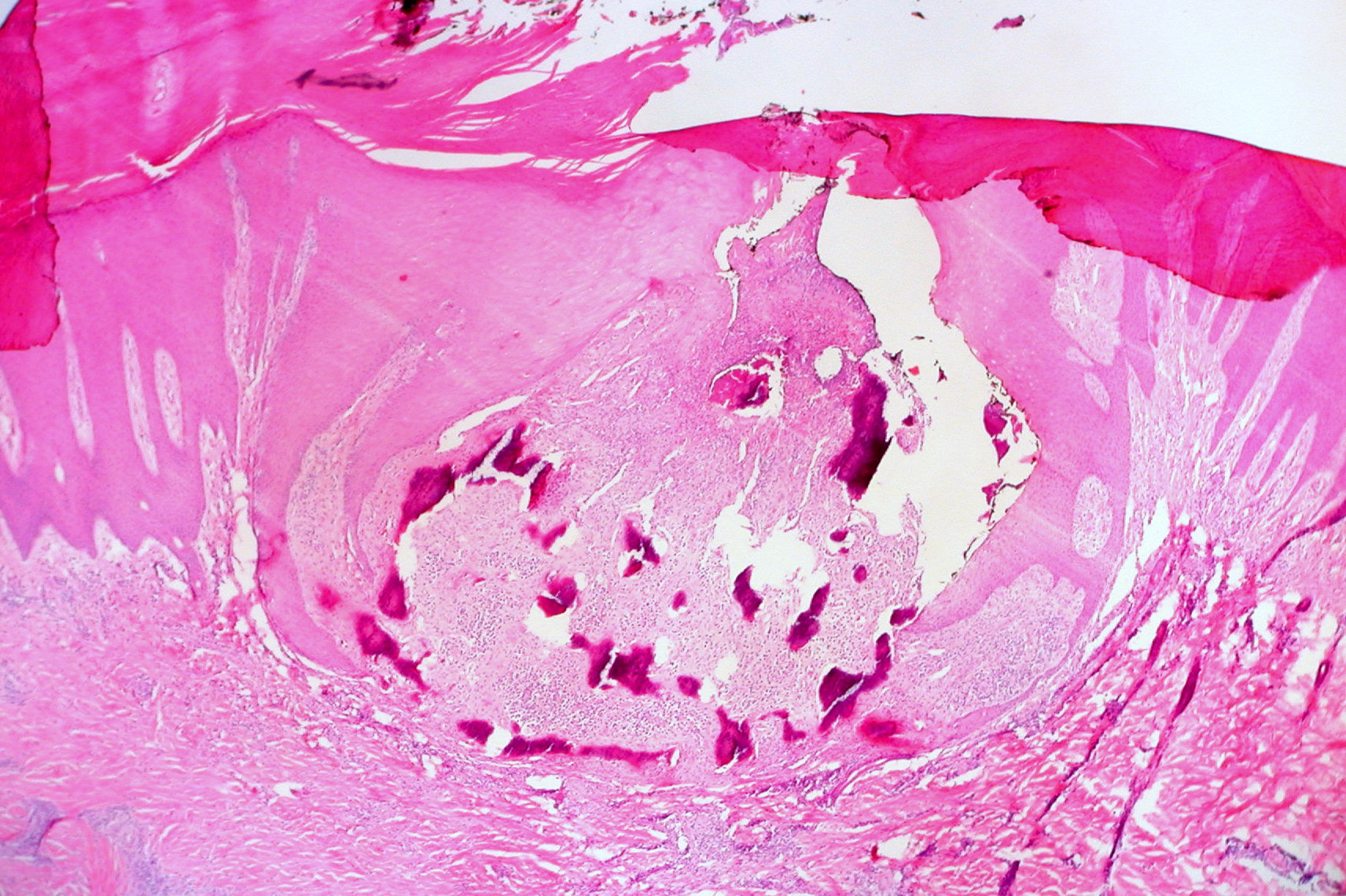
- Perforating osteoma cutis, skin of the foot
- Specialty: Oncology, dermatology

Osteoma cutis is a cutaneous condition characterized by the presence of bone within the skin in the absence of a preexisting or associated lesion. Osteoma cutis often manifests as solid, varying-sized, skin-colored subcutaneous nodules.

== Signs and symptoms ==
Osteoma cutis can present clinically as a single, asymptomatic lesion or as many lesions, depending on the circumstances. Their sizes vary from 0.1 to 5.0 cm. These lesions might show up as miliary lesions, papules, plaques, or nodules. They feel firm to the touch and might occasionally be the cause of yellowish or white spots on the skin. Bony spicules may occasionally be released from an ulcerated layer of skin above the epidermis.

== Causes ==
There are two types of osteoma cutis: primary and secondary. When an osteoma cutis does not have an underlying lesion, it is categorized as primary. Primary osteoma cutis can arise alone or in combination with metabolic syndrome. When osteoma cutis is linked to neoplasia, dysembryoplasia, scarring, or inflammatory processes, it is considered secondary.

Authors have discovered a link between persistent acne and osteoma cutis. Prolonged acne is the cause of about 85% of cases of osteoma cutis.

GNAS1 gene mutations, a crucial regulatory gene in Albright hereditary osteodystrophy and progressive osseous heteroplasia, have been linked to osteoma cutis.

== Mechanism ==
The exact process underlying the development of osteoma cutis is still unknown. There are numerous possibilities that range from nevoid tumors to hamartomas. The most widely accepted theory is that of fibroblast metaplasia.

One idea suggests that the development of osteoma cutis may be caused by the metaplasia of fibroblasts into osteoblasts as a result of changes to the genes that control the formation of new bone.

According to an alternative theory, primordial mesenchymal cells often transform into osteoblasts but move to an ectopic site.

Certain authors claim that gene mutations may also cause skin ossification.

== Diagnosis ==
Histologically, extensive eosinophilic deposits in the dermis and subcutaneous tissue are indicative of osteoma cutis. There are calcified and conspicuous cement lines and bone spicules. Occasionally, transepidermal removal of bony spicules might result in epidermal perforation. Since membrane ossification is the primary mechanism for bone development, there is no corresponding cartilage formation. Osteocytes, osteoblasts, and osteoclasts can all be seen in osteoma cutis. Haversian systems are seen in huge deposits. Bone marrow components are rarely seen.

== Treatment ==
Osteoma cutis treatment options vary depending on the condition's severity, extent, location, and cause.

Applying tretinoin cream is one non-invasive therapeutic approach, yet its effectiveness is limited, especially for small and superficial lesions.

Combinations of dermabrasion and punch biopsy, YAG laser, scalpel incisions, curettage, and CO2 laser are examples of invasive treatment techniques.

== See also ==
- Calcinosis cutis
- List of cutaneous conditions
