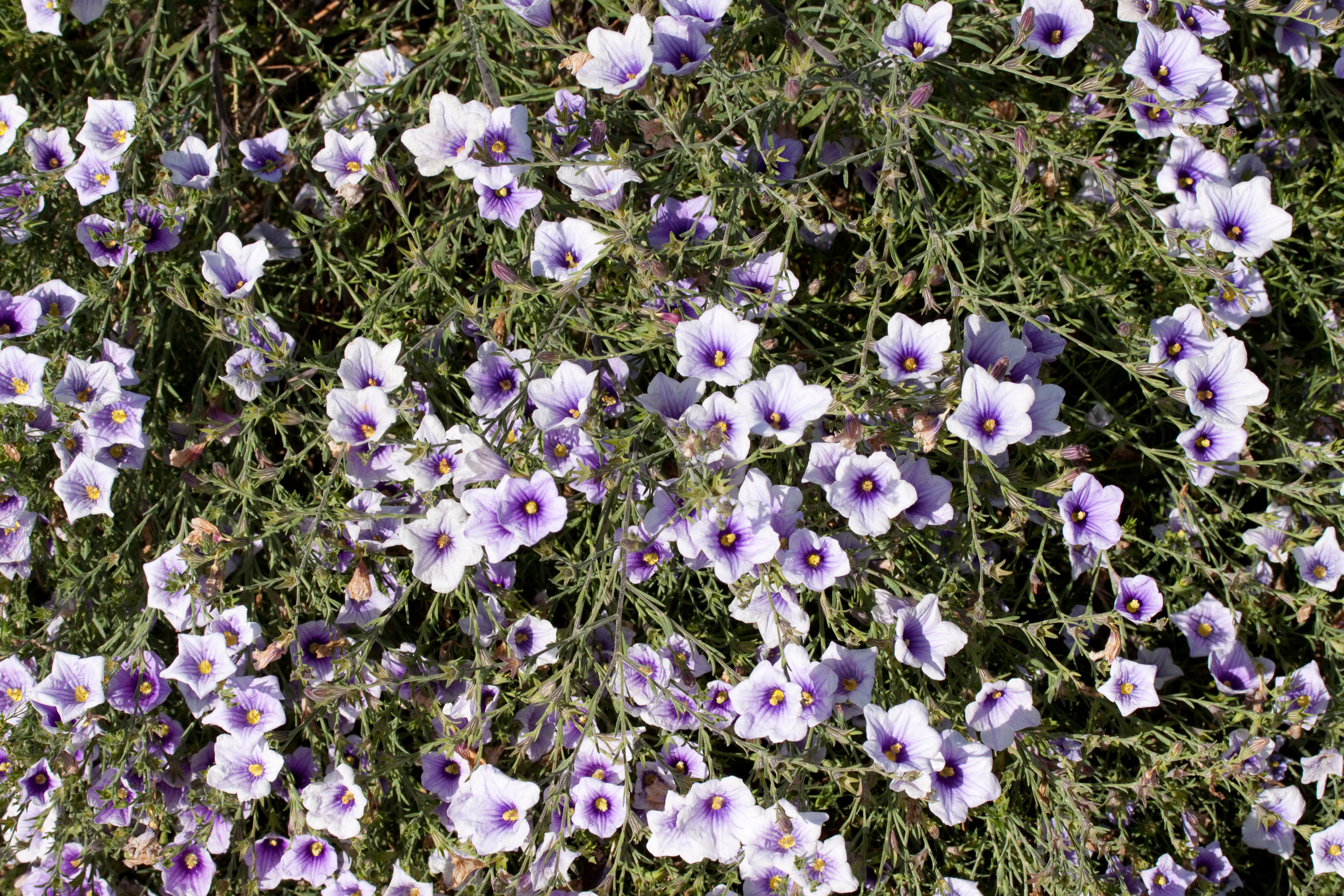

Scientific classification
- Kingdom: Plantae
- Clade: Tracheophytes
- Clade: Angiosperms
- Clade: Eudicots
- Clade: Asterids
- Order: Solanales
- Family: Solanaceae
- Genus: Nierembergia
- Species: N. scoparia

Binomial name
- Nierembergia scoparia Sendtn.

Synonyms
- Nierembergia angustifolia var. frutescens (Durieu) Kuntze; Nierembergia frutescens Durieu; Nierembergia scoparia var. breviflora Millán; Nierembergia scoparia var. longipedicellata Millán

= Nierembergia scoparia =

Species of plant

Nierembergia scoparia is a species of plant in the family Solanaceae.

It goes by the common name cupflower or tall cupflower. The species is an herbaceous perennial native to Argentina, Brazil, and Uruguay. It can grow up to 2.5 feet high. Flowers are up to an inch wide and pale blue.

The species is used as a garden plant. Cultivars have been bred to have darker purple coloration in their flowers.
