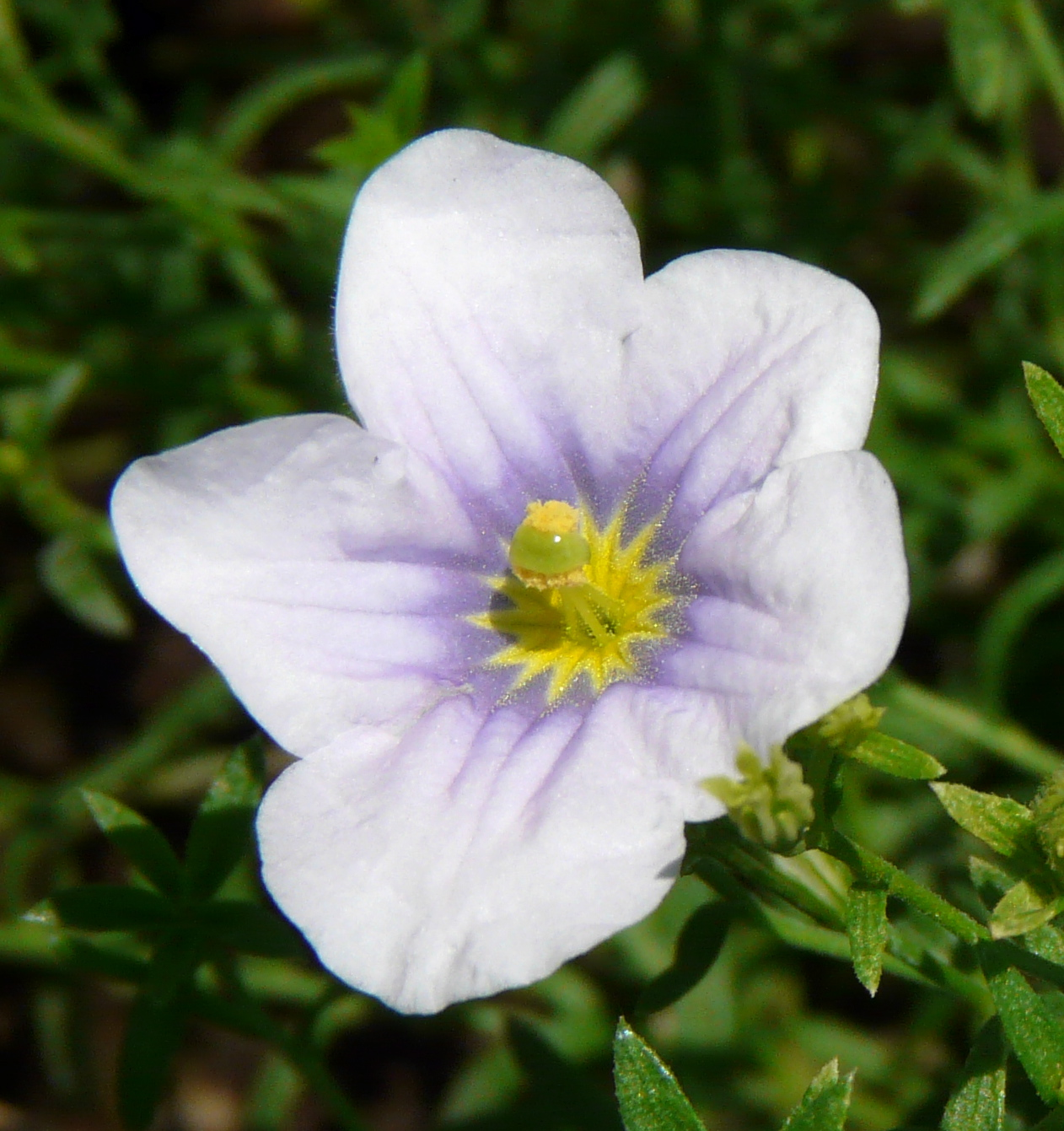
- Nierembergia frutescens

Scientific classification
- Kingdom: Plantae
- Clade: Tracheophytes
- Clade: Angiosperms
- Clade: Eudicots
- Clade: Asterids
- Order: Solanales
- Family: Solanaceae
- Subfamily: Petunioideae
- Genus: Nierembergia; Ruiz & Pav.

Species
- See text

= Nierembergia =

Genus of flowering plants

Nierembergia /ˌnɪərɛmˈbɜːrɡiə/, common name cupflower, is a genus of plants in the nightshade family. It is named after the Spanish Jesuit and mystic Juan Eusebio Nieremberg (1595-1658).

== Selected species ==
Accepted species include:

- Nierembergia andina Millán
- Nierembergia angustifolia Kunth
- Nierembergia aristata D.Don
- Nierembergia boliviana Millán
- Nierembergia browallioides Griseb.
- Nierembergia calycina Hook.
- Nierembergia ericoides Miers
- Nierembergia espinosae Steyerm.
- Nierembergia graveolens A.St.-Hil.
- Nierembergia hatschbachii A.A.Cocucci & Hunz.
- Nierembergia linariifolia Graham
- Nierembergia micrantha Cabrera
- Nierembergia pinifolia Miers
- Nierembergia pulchella Gillies ex Miers
- Nierembergia repens Ruiz & Pav.
- Nierembergia rigida Miers
- Nierembergia riograndensis Hunz. & A.A.Cocucci
- Nierembergia rivularis Miers
- Nierembergia scoparia Sendtn.
- Nierembergia spathulata Kunth
- Nierembergia tandilensis (Kuntze) Cabrera
- Nierembergia tucumanensis Millán
- Nierembergia veitchii Berk. ex Hook.
