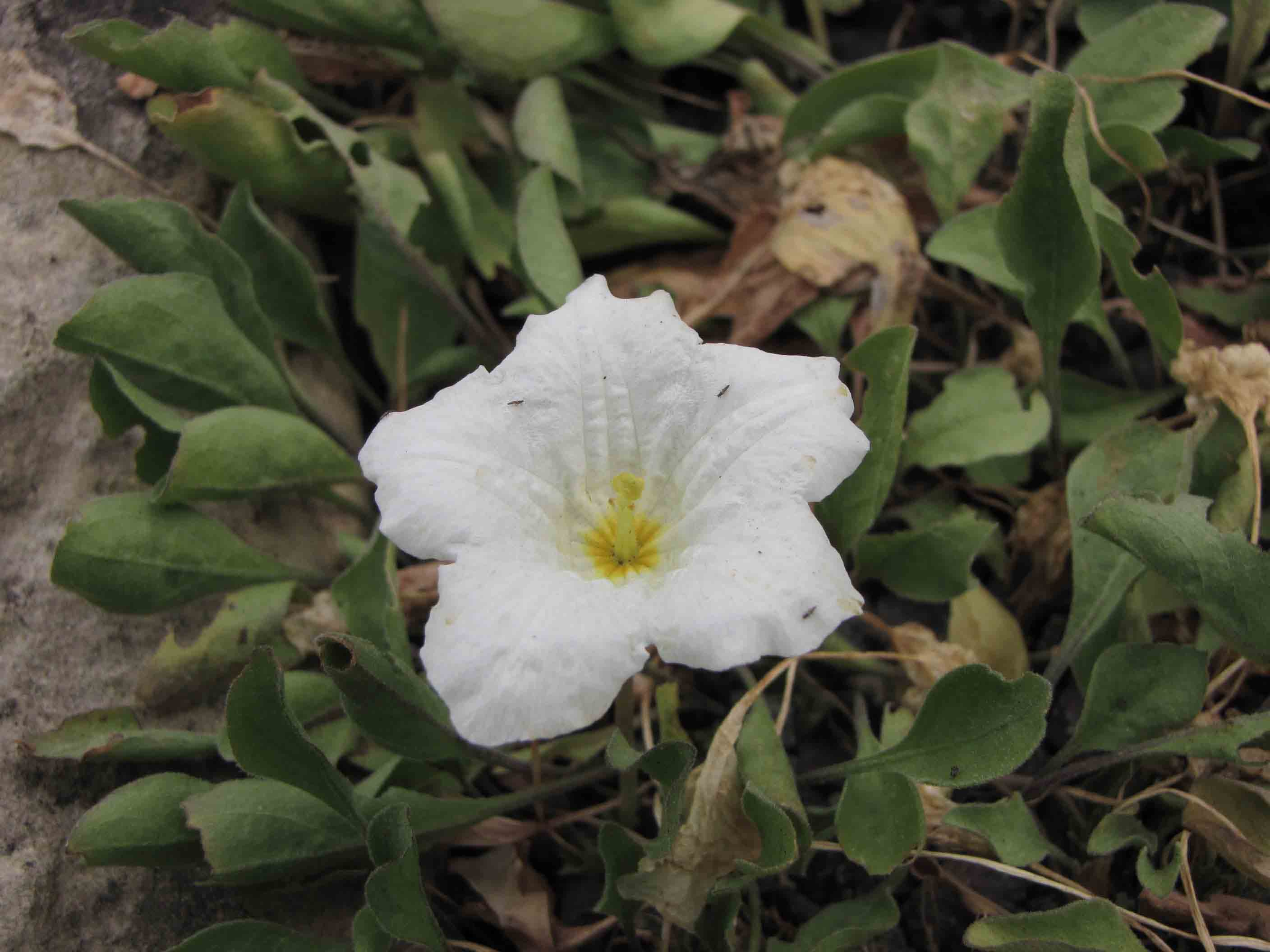

Scientific classification
- Kingdom: Plantae
- Clade: Tracheophytes
- Clade: Angiosperms
- Clade: Eudicots
- Clade: Asterids
- Order: Solanales
- Family: Solanaceae
- Genus: Nierembergia
- Species: N. rivularis

Binomial name
- Nierembergia rivularis Miers

Synonyms
- Heterotypic Synonyms: Nierembergia petiolata J.Rémy

= Nierembergia rivularis =

Whitecup

Species of flowering plant

Nierembergia rivularis is a species of flowering plant in the family Solanaceae. This ornamental plant is sometimes referred to by the common names whitecup, water neirembergia, or chuscho. It is native to Northeast and Northwest Argentina, Bolivia, Southeast Brazil, and Uruguay.

== Toxicity ==
It has been reported to cause calcification of soft tissues and vital organs (enzootic calcinosis) in sheep in Uruguay.
