= Dystrophic calcification =

Accumulation of calcium in degenerated or necrotic tissue

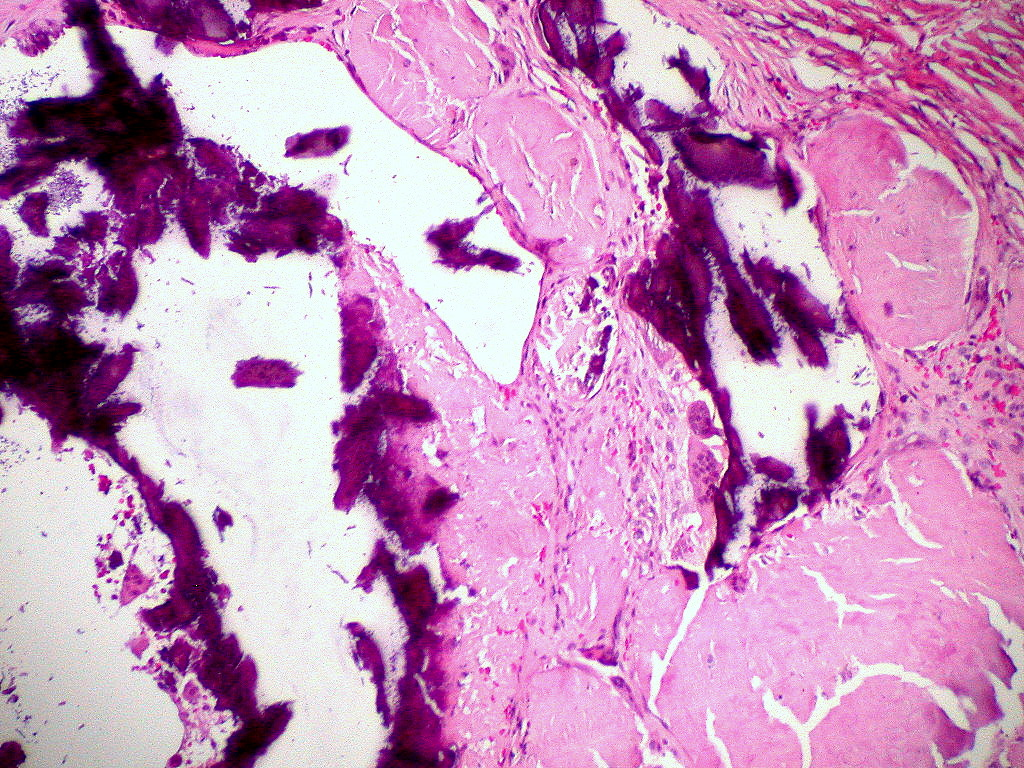
Amyloidosis, dystrophic calcification

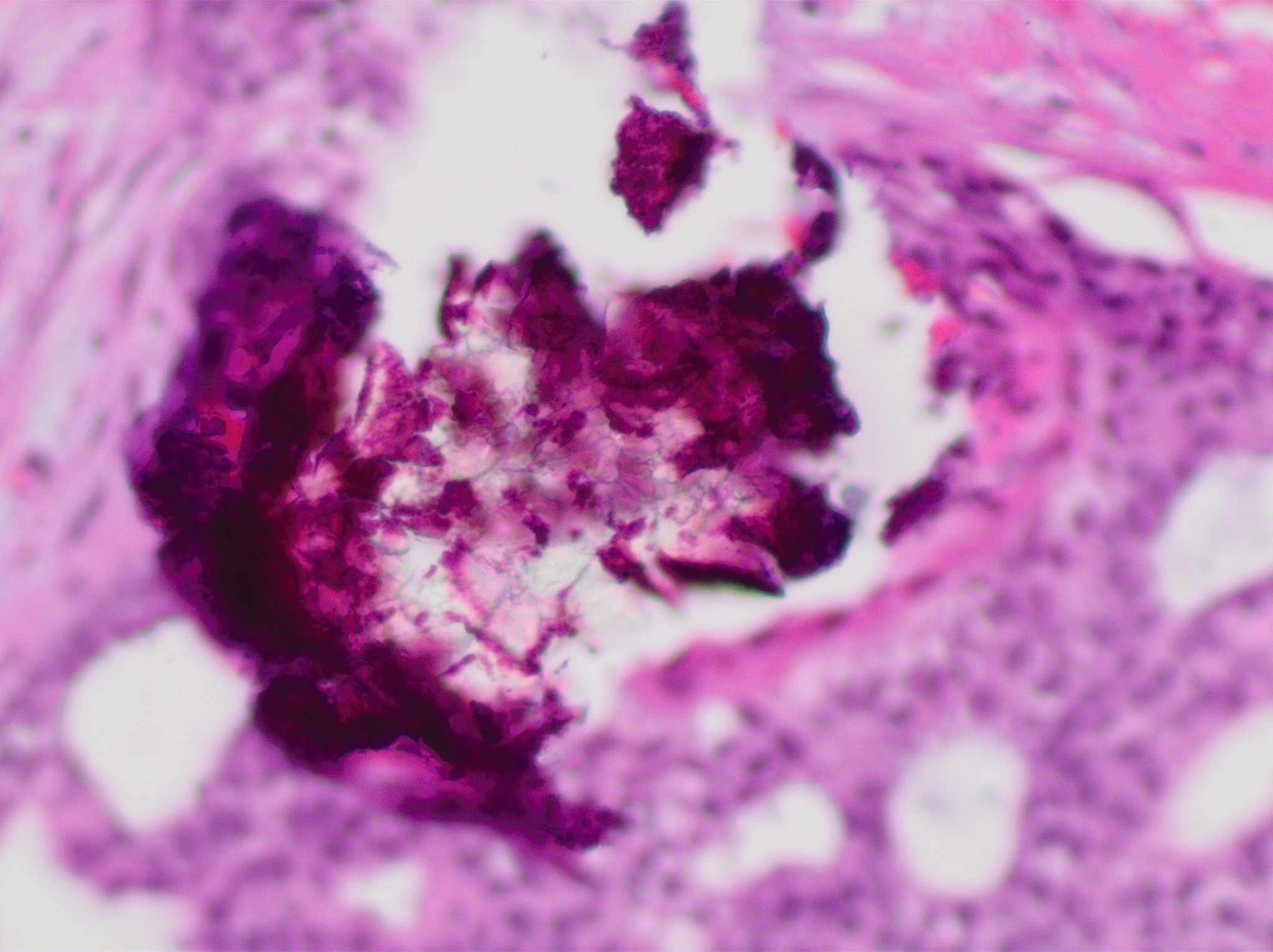
Histopathology of dystrophic microcalcifications in ductal carcinoma in situ of the breast, H&E stain. In contrast to an artifact of crowded cells, the calcification characteristically extends outside the focal plane, as the background DCIS is blurred in this focus.

Dystrophic calcification (DC) is the calcification occurring in degenerated or necrotic tissue, as in hyalinized scars, degenerated foci in leiomyomas, and caseous nodules. This occurs as a reaction to tissue damage, including as a consequence of medical device implantation. Dystrophic calcification can occur even if the amount of calcium in the blood is not elevated, in contrast to metastatic calcification, which is a consequence of a systemic mineral imbalance, including hypercalcemia and/or hyperphosphatemia, that leads to calcium deposition in healthy tissues. In dystrophic calcification, basophilic calcium salt deposits aggregate, first in the mitochondria, then progressively throughout the cell. These calcifications are an indication of previous microscopic cell injury, occurring in areas of cell necrosis when activated phosphatases bind calcium ions to phospholipids in the membrane.

== Calcification in dead tissue ==
1. Caseous necrosis in T.B. is most common site of dystrophic calcification.
2. Liquefactive necrosis in chronic abscesses may get calcified.
3. Fat necrosis following acute pancreatitis or traumatic fat necrosis in breasts results in deposition of calcium soaps.
4. Infarcts may undergo D.C.
5. Thrombi, especially in veins, may produce phleboliths.
6. Haematomas in the vicinity of bones may undergo D.C.
7. Dead parasites like schistosoma eggs may calcify.
8. Congenital toxoplasmosis, CMV or rubella may be seen on X-ray as calcifications in the brain.

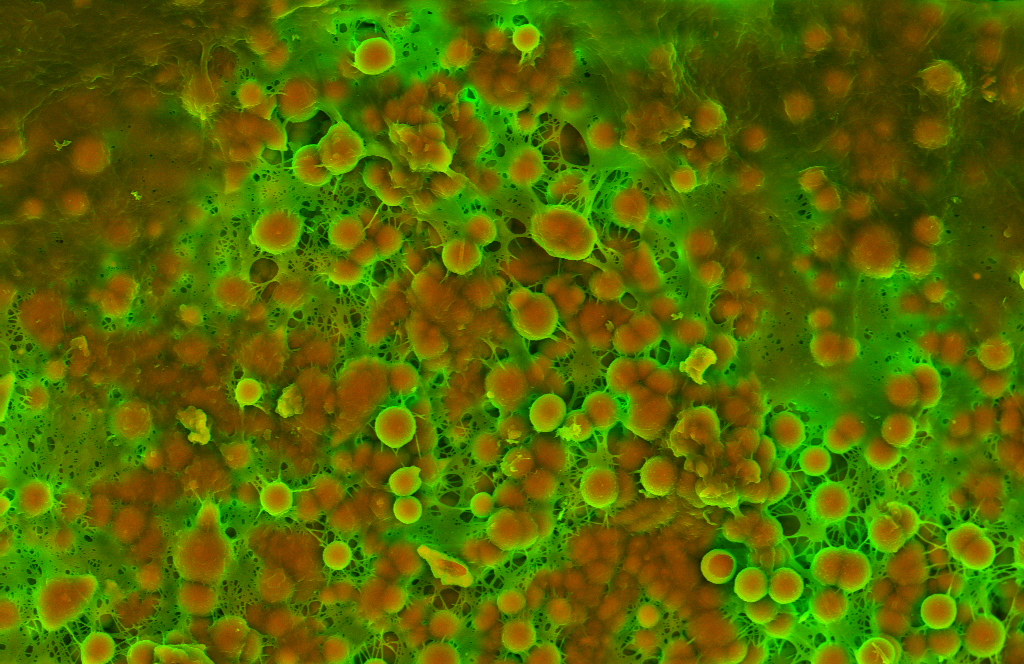
Density-Dependent Colour Scanning Electron Micrograph SEM (DDC-SEM) of cardiovascular calcification, showing in orange calcium phosphate spherical particles (denser material) and, in green, the extracellular matrix (less dense material).

== Calcification in degenerated tissue ==
1. Dense scars may undergo hyaline degeneration and calcification.
2. Atheroma in aorta and coronaries frequently undergo calcification.
3. Cysts can show calcification.
4. Calcinosis cutis is condition in which there are irregular nodular deposits of calcium salts in skin and subcutaneous tissue.
5. Senile degenerative changes may be accompanied by calcification.
6. The inherited disorder pseudoxanthoma elasticum may lead to angioid streaks with calcification of Bruch's membrane, the elastic tissue below the retinal ring.

== See also ==
- Calcinosis
- Monckeberg's arteriosclerosis
