= Calcinosis cutis =

Medical condition in which calcium deposits form in the skin

- Other names: Cutaneous calcification
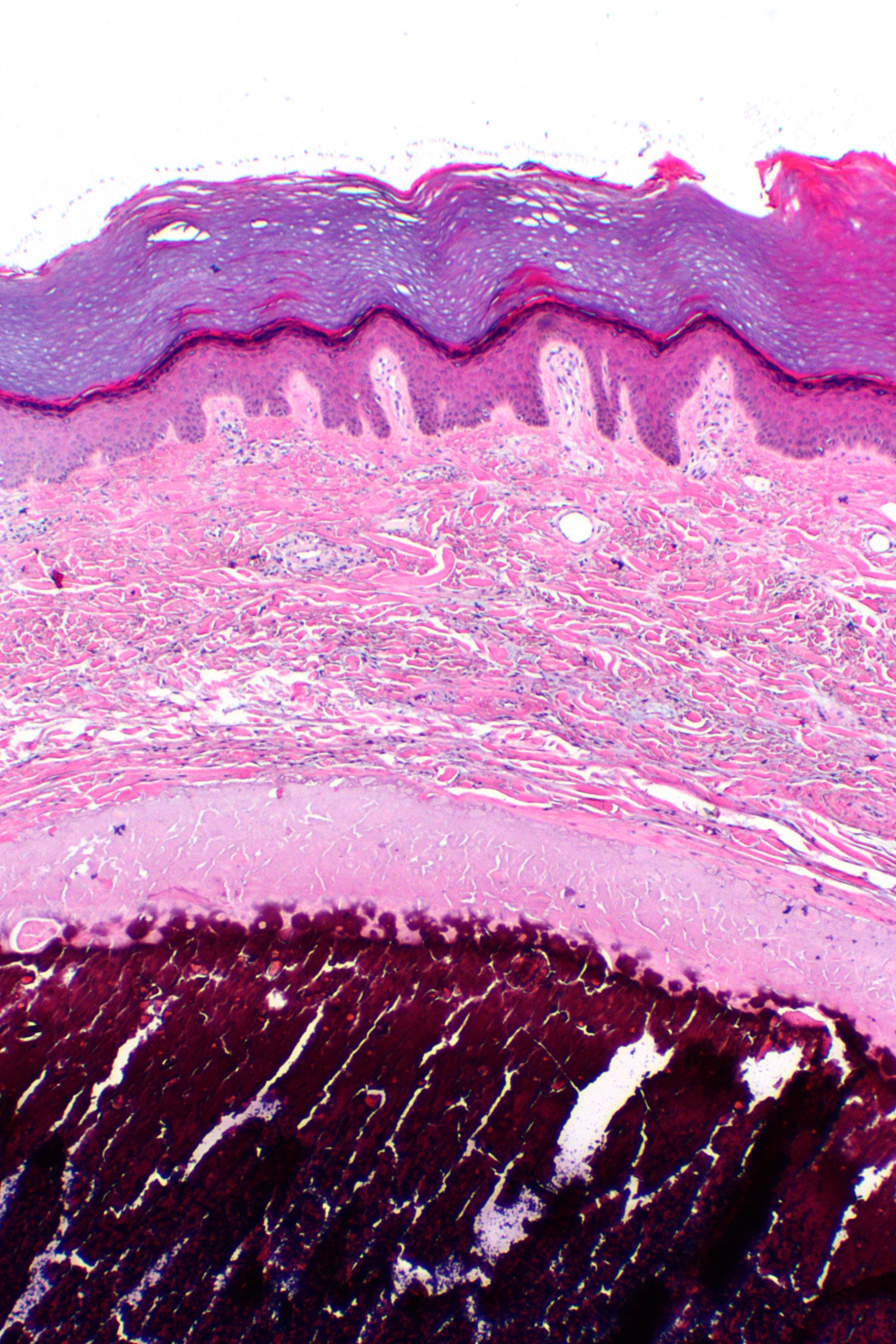
- Micrograph of calcinosis cutis. The calcification is purple (bottom of image). H&E stain.
- Specialty: Dermatology

Calcinosis cutis is an uncommon condition marked by calcium buildup in the skin and subcutaneous tissues. Calcinosis cutis can range in intensity from little nodules in one area of the body to huge, crippling lesions affecting a vast portion of the body. Five kinds of the condition are typically distinguished: calciphylaxis, idiopathic calcification, iatrogenic calcification, dystrophic calcification, and metastatic calcification.

Tumors, inflammation, varicose veins, infections, connective tissue disease, hyperphosphatemia, and hypercalcemia can all lead to calcinosis. Systemic sclerosis is linked to calcineuris cutis. Calcinosis is seen in Limited Cutaneous Systemic Sclerosis, also known as CREST syndrome (the "C" in CREST).

== Signs and symptoms ==
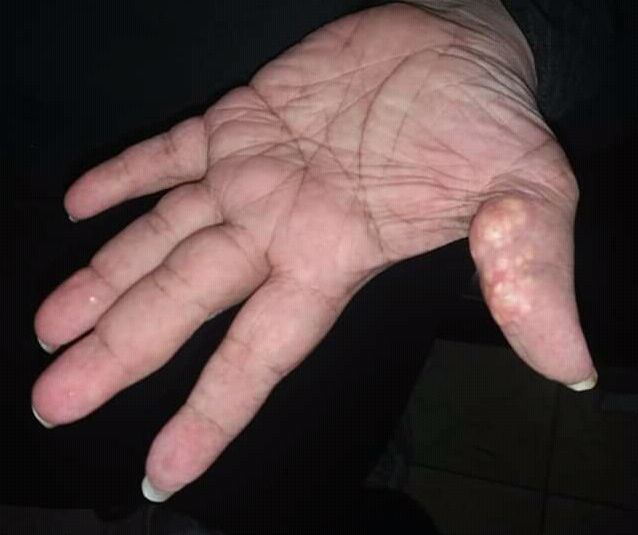

Lesions might be more severe and widespread, or they can develop gradually and show no symptoms. The nodules may cause pain and hinder function in addition to having a variety of sizes and shapes. The underlying condition determines the localization of the lesions in dystrophic calcification. The elbows, fingers, knees, and forearms are the most often affected regions in people with systemic sclerosis. Elbows, knees, and regions of prior inflammatory lesions in dermatomyositis are affected by calcification. Lupus erythematosus affects the limbs, buttocks, area beneath lupus lesions, and periarticular areas. Periarticular lesions are found in metastatic calcification. In tumoral calcinosis, the lesions are found around joints, but in idiopathic calcification, the lesions are found on children's faces as subepidermal calcified nodules. In iatrogenic calcification, the calcification is found at venipuncture sites.

== Causes ==
Calcinosis may result from a variety of causes such as:

- Trauma to the region
- Inflammation (bug bites, acne)
- Varicose veins
- Infections
- Tumors (malignant or benign)
- Diseases of connective tissue
- Hypercalcemia
- Hyperphosphatemia

Calcinosis cutis is associated with systemic sclerosis.

== Diagnosis ==
=== Classification ===
Calcinosis cutis may be divided into the following types:

==== Dystrophic calcinosis cutis ====
Dystrophic calcinosis cutis is the most prevalent kind of calcification on the skin. The ectopic calcified mass usually consists of amorphous calcium phosphate and hydroxyapatite. Dystrophic calcification is linked to a number of illnesses, such as infections, hereditary diseases, cutaneous neoplasms, and connective tissue diseases. The clinical manifestation can be as minor as an accidental radiography imaging finding or as severe as subcutaneous nodules or plaques.

==== Metastatic calcinosis cutis ====
Metastatic calcinosis cutis is the consequence of calcium salts precipitating in normal tissue due to an underlying abnormality in the metabolism of phosphate and/or calcium. Metastatic calcification can result from any systemic condition raising serum calcium and/or phosphate levels. Chronic renal failure is the most frequent underlying cause.

==== Iatrogenic calcinosis cutis ====
Iatrogenic calcinosis cutis is characterized by firm nodules in the subcutis or dermis, which are caused by calcium salts precipitating quickly in the skin. This occurrence typically manifests as a warm, sensitive swelling at the site of venipuncture, and it most frequently happens following the extravasation of intravenous calcium chloride, calcium gluconate, or phosphate-containing solutions. Iatrogenic calcification, which manifests as soft yellow-white epidermal plaques, has also been linked to calcium salt exposure via electroencephalography or electromyographic electrode compounds.

==== Traumatic calcinosis cutis ====
Traumatic calcinosis cutis is a cutaneous condition characterized by calcification of the skin resulting from the deposition of calcium and phosphorus often resulting from occupational exposure, as in cases reported in oil-field workers and coal miners.

==== Idiopathic calcinosis cutis ====
Skin calcification that is not linked to a systemic illness or an underlying tissue injury is referred to as idiopathic calcification. Most often, the calcification is restricted to a single general location, yet there has been one case of calcinosis cutis that is exceptionally broad.

==== Idiopathic scrotal calcinosis ====
Idiopathic scrotal calcinosis is a cutaneous condition characterized by calcification of the skin resulting from the deposition of calcium and phosphorus occurring on the scrotum. However, the levels of calcium and phosphate in the blood are normal. Idiopathic scrotal calcinosis typically affects young males, with an onset between adolescence and early adulthood. The scrotal calcinosis appears, without any symptoms, as yellowish nodules that range in size from 1 mm to several centimeters.

==== Subepidermal calcified nodule ====
Subepidermal calcified nodule is characterized by calcification of the skin resulting from the deposition of calcium and phosphorus, occurring most frequently as one or a few skin lesions on the scalp or face of children.

==== Tumoral calcinosis ====
Tumoral calcinosis is distinguished by the accumulation of calcific masses surrounding the main joints. It mainly affects teens who are otherwise in good health. Joint function may be hampered by the subcutaneous or intramuscular calcified deposits.

==== Osteoma cutis ====
Osteoma cutis is a cutaneous condition characterized by the presence of bone within the skin in the absence of a preexisting or associated lesion. Osteoma cutis often manifests as solid, varying-sized, skin-colored subcutaneous nodules.

== Treatment ==
Diltiazem, a calcium channel blocker, has been a mainstay of medical treatment for calcinosis cutis. It is thought to work by modifying intracellular calcium levels, which reduces the capacity for the production and crystallization of calcium nidus.

Colchicine is an antimicrotubule drug with anti-inflammatory properties that has been used for gouty arthritis treatment for a long time. Calcinosis cutis inflammation brought on by a foreign body-like response aggravates the illness's symptoms. Colchicine, therefore, has been used to treat calcinosis cutis, albeit with varying degrees of success.

== Gallery ==
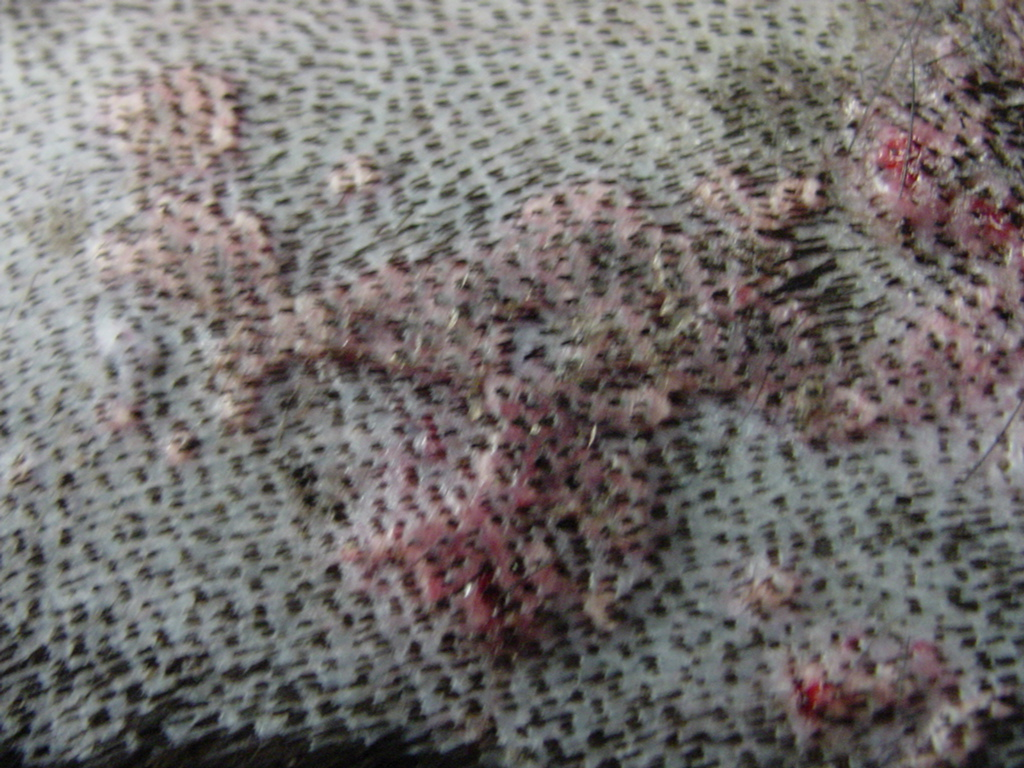
Calcinosis cutis in a dog with Cushing's syndrome

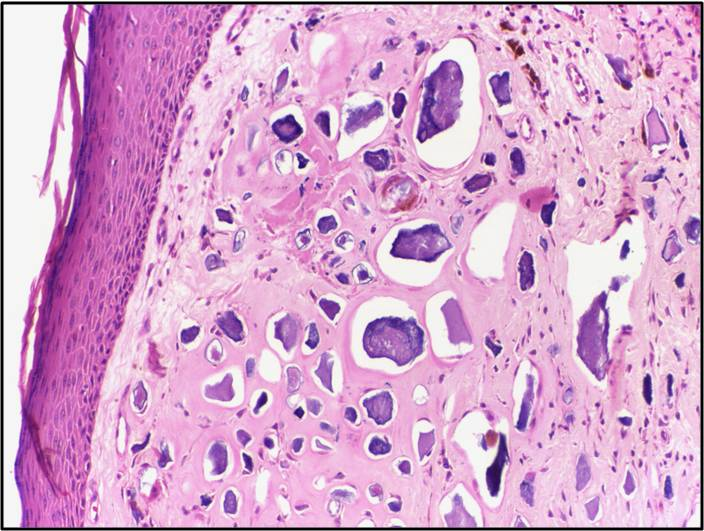
Histopathology of calcinosis cutis in human tissue

== See also ==
- Calcinosis
- List of cutaneous conditions
