= Secretin-cholecystokinin test =

- Purpose: assess the function of both the pancreas and gall bladder

The secretin-cholecystokinin test (aka Secretin-CCK test, Secretin-Pancreozymin test) is a combination of the secretin test and the cholecystokinin test and is used to assess the function of both the pancreas and gall bladder.

== Principle ==
Cholecystokinin (CKK) is a peptide hormone secreted by I-cells in the intestinal mucosa. It stimulates the secretion of pancreatic fluid into the duodenum through the sphincter of oddi. This fluid is rich in pancreatic enzymes amylase, trypsin, and lipase. It also promotes contraction and relaxation of the gallbladder.

Secretin is a peptide hormone that stimulates the secretion of both pancreatic fluid and bicarbonate.

The Secretin-cholecystokinin test is considered the gold standard test of pancreatic exocrine function. It is now rarely used in adults in favour of non-invasive tests, though it is still used in some cases in infants with pancreatic insufficiency to distinguish between cystic fibrosis and Schwachman-Diamond syndrome.

== Procedure ==
After fasting overnight, a catheter is passed into the patient's duodenum. The patient receives sequential intravenous injections of first secretin then either CKK or a synthetic 8-residue peptide representing the C-terminal 8 of CKK (ceruletide). Duodenal fluid is collected at 15 minute intervals for at least an hour, and the properties of the fluid are used to assess exocrine function of the pancreas.

The CCK test may be administered in conjunction with an ultrasound test to visually monitor gall bladder contraction. While the test is usually administered in a supine position, Dr. William Smedley of Wilkes Barre, Pennsylvania has detected previously missed gallbladder abnormalities by administering the test in an erect position.

The concentration and output of bicarbonate with the secretin-CCK test is similar to what has been observed with the standard secretin test. The secretin-induced rapid flow of water results in lower and often unreliable enzyme concentrations. CCK also induces gallbladder contraction and the release of bile, which may further dilute enzyme concentrations. As a result, the quantification of total enzyme output (units/min) must be determined through continuous collection of duodenal fluid with or without the use of perfusion markers. Measurement of more than one enzyme (i.e. amylase, lipase, and tryptase) and bicarbonate may improve sensitivity since some patients may possess deficiencies of one parameter and not the others.

== Interpretation ==
One study reviewed the relative diagnostic value of enzyme and bicarbonate concentrations compared with enzyme output in 363 secretin-CCK tests. The investigators also evaluated the requirement for perfusion markers to accurately quantify volume, and the validity of a shortened sampling time (first 20 minutes). Only 60 percent of volume was recovered with the duodenal aspiration tube, suggesting that marker perfusion to correct for distal loss of secretion is important to accurately quantify volume.

Using a trypsin output <50 U/kg/h as the reference standard, measurement of enzyme concentration alone misclassified approximately 10 percent of patients. Use of a shortened collection time misclassified approximately 4 percent of patients. The authors concluded that this was an unacceptably high rate of misclassification and that the standard prolonged collection of fluid using a perfusion marker must be performed to accurately measure exocrine function.
