= GALNT3 =

Protein-coding gene in the species Homo sapiens

Identifiers
- Aliases: GALNT3, GalNAc-T3, HFTC, HHS, polypeptide N-acetylgalactosaminyltransferase 3, HFTC1
- External IDs: OMIM: 601756; MGI: 894695; GeneCards: GALNT3
Enzyme activity
EC #	BRENDA	ExPASy	KEGG	MetaCyc
2.4.1.41	↗	↗	↗	↗

Gene location (Human)
Chr.	Chromosome 2 (human)
Band	2q24.3	Start	165,747,588 bp
Band	2q24.3	End	165,794,659 bp

Gene location (Mouse)
Chr.	Chromosome 2 (mouse)
Band	2|2 C1.3	Start	65,913,110 bp
Band	2|2 C1.3	End	65,955,338 bp
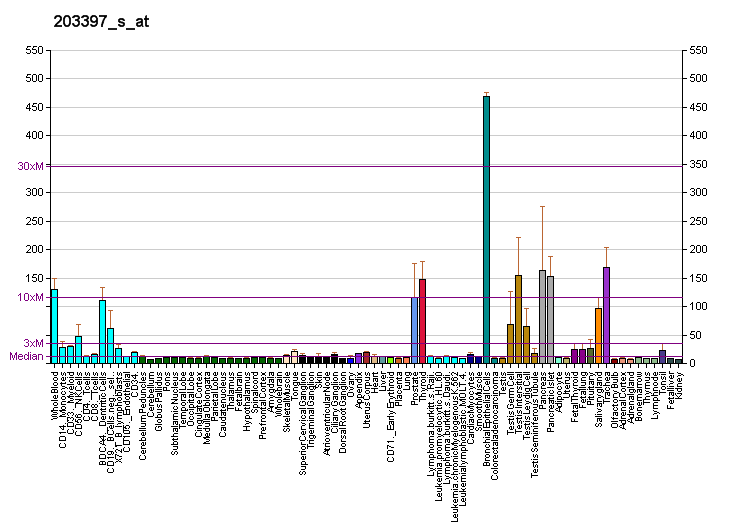

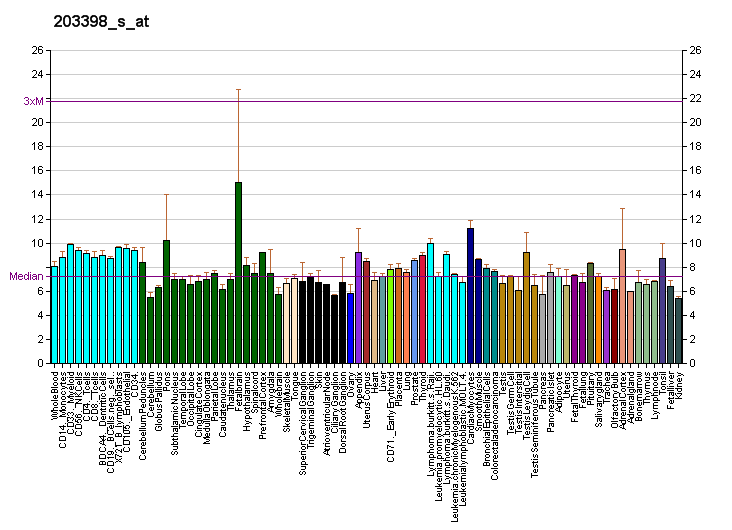
RNA expression pattern
Bgee	Human / Mouse (ortholog); Top expressed in: mucosa of sigmoid colon; bronchial epithelial cell; parotid gland; jejunal mucosa; rectum; palpebral conjunctiva; gingival epithelium; pylorus; right uterine tube; duodenum / Top expressed in: parotid gland; lacrimal gland; submandibular gland; spermatocyte; spermatid; right kidney; seminiferous tubule; conjunctival fornix; epithelium of stomach; mucous cell of stomach; More reference expression data
BioGPS	More reference expression data
Gene ontology
Molecular function	transferase activity; calcium ion binding; manganese ion binding; glycosyltransferase activity; metal ion binding; polypeptide N-acetylgalactosaminyltransferase activity; protein binding; carbohydrate binding
Cellular component	integral component of membrane; Golgi apparatus; membrane; Golgi membrane; Golgi cisterna membrane; perinuclear region of cytoplasm; extracellular exosome
Biological process	protein O-linked glycosylation via serine; protein glycosylation; protein O-linked glycosylation via threonine; O-glycan processing; fibroblast growth factor receptor signaling pathway; carbohydrate metabolic process
Sources:Amigo / QuickGO
Orthologs
Databases	NCBI: entry; OMA: entry
Species	Human	Mouse
Entrez	2591	14425
Ensembl	ENSG00000115339	ENSMUSG00000026994
UniProt	Q14435	P70419
RefSeq (mRNA)	NM_004482	NM_015736
RefSeq (protein)	NP_004473	NP_056551
Location (UCSC)	Chr 2: 165.75 – 165.79 Mb	Chr 2: 65.91 – 65.96 Mb
PubMed search
- Wikidata
View/Edit Human	View/Edit Mouse

Polypeptide N-acetylgalactosaminyltransferase 3 is an enzyme that in humans is encoded by the GALNT3 gene.

This gene encodes UDP-GalNAc transferase 3, a member of the polypeptide GalNAc transferase (GalNAc-T) family. This family transfers an N-acetyl galactosamine to the hydroxyl group of a serine or threonine residue in the first step of O-linked oligosaccharide biosynthesis. Individual GalNAc-transferases have distinct activities and initiation of O-glycosylation is regulated by a repertoire of GalNAc-transferases. The protein encoded by this gene is highly homologous to other family members; however, the enzymes have different substrate specificities.
