= Polypeptide N-acetylgalactosaminyltransferase =

Class of enzymes

polypeptide N-acetylgalactosaminyltransferase

Identifiers
- EC no.: 2.4.1.41
- CAS no.: 9075-15-4

Databases
- IntEnz: IntEnz view
- BRENDA: BRENDA entry
- ExPASy: NiceZyme view
- KEGG: KEGG entry
- MetaCyc: metabolic pathway
- PRIAM: profile
- PDB structures: RCSB PDB PDBe PDBsum
- Gene Ontology: AmiGO / QuickGO
Search
- PMC: articles
- PubMed: articles
- NCBI: proteins

In enzymology, a polypeptide N-acetylgalactosaminyltransferase (EC 2.4.1.41) is an enzyme that catalyzes the chemical reaction

UDP-N-acetyl-D-galactosamine + polypeptide $\rightleftharpoons$ UDP + N-acetyl-D-galactosaminyl-polypeptide

Thus, the two substrates of this enzyme are UDP-N-acetyl-D-galactosamine and polypeptide, whereas its two products are UDP and N-acetyl-D-galactosaminyl-polypeptide.

This enzyme belongs to the family of glycosyltransferases, specifically the hexosyltransferases. This enzyme participates in O-glycan biosynthesis and glycan structures - biosynthesis 1. It has 2 cofactors: manganese, and calcium.

== Nomenclature ==
The systematic name of this enzyme class is UDP-N-acetyl-D-galactosamine:polypeptide N-acetylgalactosaminyl-transferase. Other names in common use include:

- protein-UDP acetylgalactosaminyltransferase,
- UDP-GalNAc:polypeptide N-acetylgalactosaminyl transferase,
- UDP-N-acetylgalactosamine:kappa-casein polypeptide,
- N-acetylgalactosaminyltransferase,
- uridine diphosphoacetylgalactosamine-glycoprotein,
- acetylgalactosaminyltransferase,
- glycoprotein acetylgalactosaminyltransferase,
- polypeptide-N-acetylgalactosamine transferase,
- UDP-acetylgalactosamine-glycoprotein,
- acetylgalactosaminyltransferase,
- UDP-acetylgalactosamine:peptide-N-galactosaminyltransferase,
- UDP-GalNAc:polypeptide N-acetylgalactosaminyltransferase,
- UDP-N-acetyl-alpha-D-galactosamine:polypeptide,
- N-acetylgalactosaminyltransferase,
- UDP-N-acetylgalactosamine-glycoprotein,
- N-acetylgalactosaminyltransferase,
- UDP-N-acetylgalactosamine-protein N-acetylgalactosaminyltransferase,
- UDP-N-acetylgalactosamine:polypeptide,
- N-acetylgalactosaminyltransferase, and
- UDP-N-acetylgalactosamine:protein N-acetylgalactosaminyl transferase.
