= Metastatic calcification =

Deposition of calcium salts in tissue due to excess calcium in blood

Metastatic calcification is deposition of calcium salts in otherwise normal tissue, because of elevated serum levels of calcium, which can occur because of deranged metabolism as well as increased absorption or decreased excretion of calcium and related minerals, as seen in hyperparathyroidism.

In contrast, dystrophic calcification is caused by abnormalities or degeneration of tissues resulting in mineral deposition, though blood levels of calcium remain normal. These differences in pathology also mean that metastatic calcification is often found in many tissues throughout a person or animal, whereas dystrophic calcification is localized.

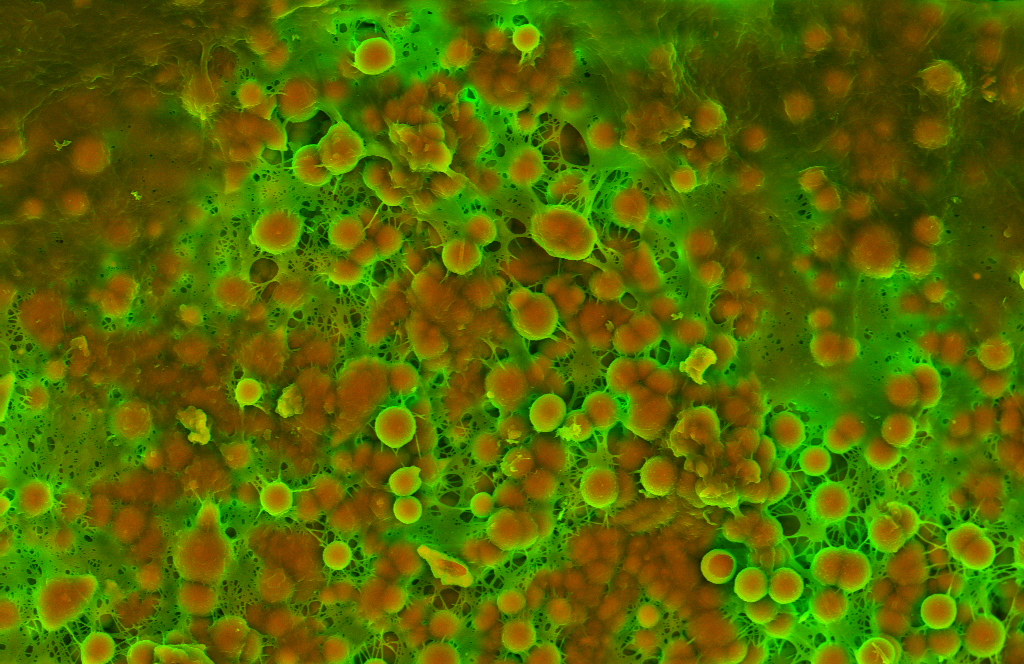
Density-Dependent Colour Scanning Electron Micrograph SEM (DDC-SEM) of cardiovascular calcification, showing in orange calcium phosphate spherical particles (denser material) and, in green, the extracellular matrix (less dense material).

Metastatic calcification can occur widely throughout the body but principally affects the interstitial tissues of the vasculature, kidneys, lungs, and gastric mucosa. For the latter three, acid secretions or rapid changes in pH levels contribute to the formation of salts.

== Causes ==
Hypercalcemia, elevated blood calcium, has numerous causes, including

1. Elevated levels of parathyroid hormone due to hyperparathyroidism, leading to bone resorption and subsequent hypercalcemia by reducing phosphate concentration.
2. Secretion of parathyroid hormone-related protein by certain tumors.
3. Resorption of bone due to
  - Primary bone marrow tumors (e.g. multiple myeloma and leukemia)
  - Metastasis of other tumors, breast cancer for example, to bone.
  - Paget disease
  - Immobilization
4. Vitamin D related disorders
  1. Vitamin D intoxication
  2. Williams syndrome (increased sensitivity to vitamin D)
  3. Sarcoidosis
5. Kidney failure
