= Bedridden =

Descriptor for the inability to sit or stand upright

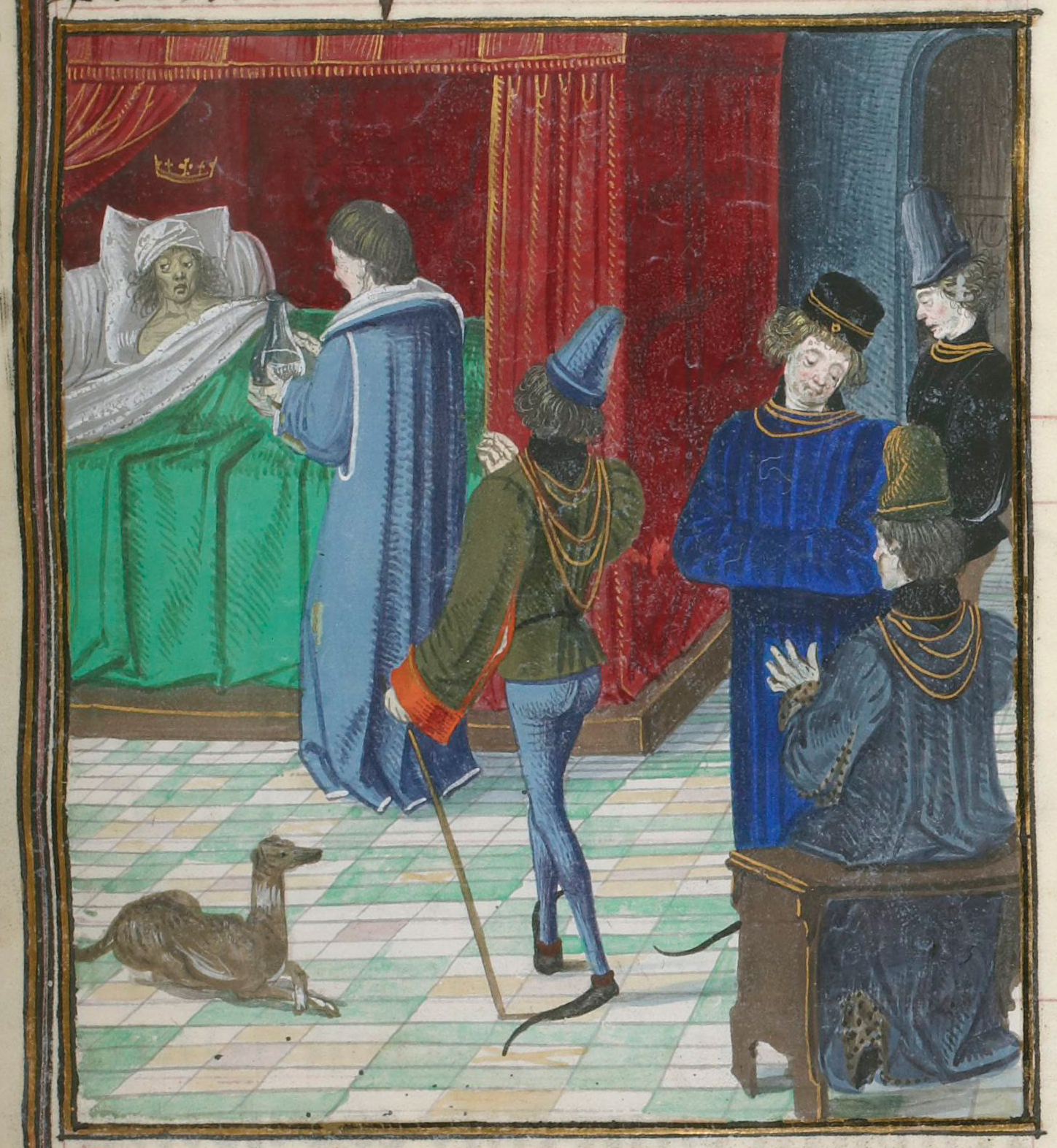
Charles VI bedridden and his physician

Being bedridden is a form of immobility that can present as the inability to move or even sit upright. It differs from bed-rest, a form of non-invasive treatment that is usually part of recovery or the limitation of activities. Some of the more serious consequences of being bedridden are the high risk of developing thrombosis and muscle wasting (atrophy).

== Etymology ==
The word "bedridden" is derived from the Middle English term bedrid, the past tense form of riding a bed, which dates back to the 14th century.

== Bed rest ==
This is a voluntary medical treatment still used today to help cure illness. Current views regarding this treatment are that there are no benefits for most conditions studied. Though bedrest may still be prescribed for pregnant women, it is now considered dangerous. Those who are bedridden can develop complications related to feeding.

== Complications ==
Being bedridden leads to many complications such as loss of muscle strength and endurance. Contractures, osteoporosis from disuse and the degeneration of joints can occur. Being confined to bed can add to the likelihood of developing an increased heart rate, decreased cardiac output, hypertension, and thromboembolism. People with disabilities who are bedridden are at risk for developing pressure sores. Those who are bedridden are at risk in a house fire due to their lack of mobility. Showering can become impossible. Bedsores develop if a person spends most or all of the day in bed without changing position Being confined to bed may result in a person remaining passive and withdrawn. The ability to transfer to a chair and the negative attitudes of caregivers is associated with continued confinement to bed and reduction of such requests. Those who are confined to bed have risks related to falls. Falling from a bed can result in injury.

== Prevention ==
One recommendation for preventing the complications of being bedridden is to eat a healthy, well-balanced diet that contains enough calories and protein needed for optimum health. If someone is confined to a bed, changing position at least every two hours can help prevent complications in addition to changing sheeting and bedclothes immediately if they are soiled, and using items that can help reduce pressure, such as pillows or foam padding.

== Studies ==
One Indian study of care given to bedridden individuals at home found that family members made up 82% of caregivers. A high rate of medical complications was reported, including pressure ulcers and urinary tract infections.
