= Papular eruption of blacks =

- Specialty: Dermatology

Papular eruption of blacks is a cutaneous condition characterized clinically by small, pruritic papules and histologically by a mononuclear cell-eosinophil perivascular infiltrate.

== See also ==
- Pachydermatous eosinophilic dermatitis
- List of cutaneous conditions
