= Morphea =

Form of scleroderma involving isolated patches of hardened skin

- Other names: Localized scleroderma or Circumscribed scleroderma
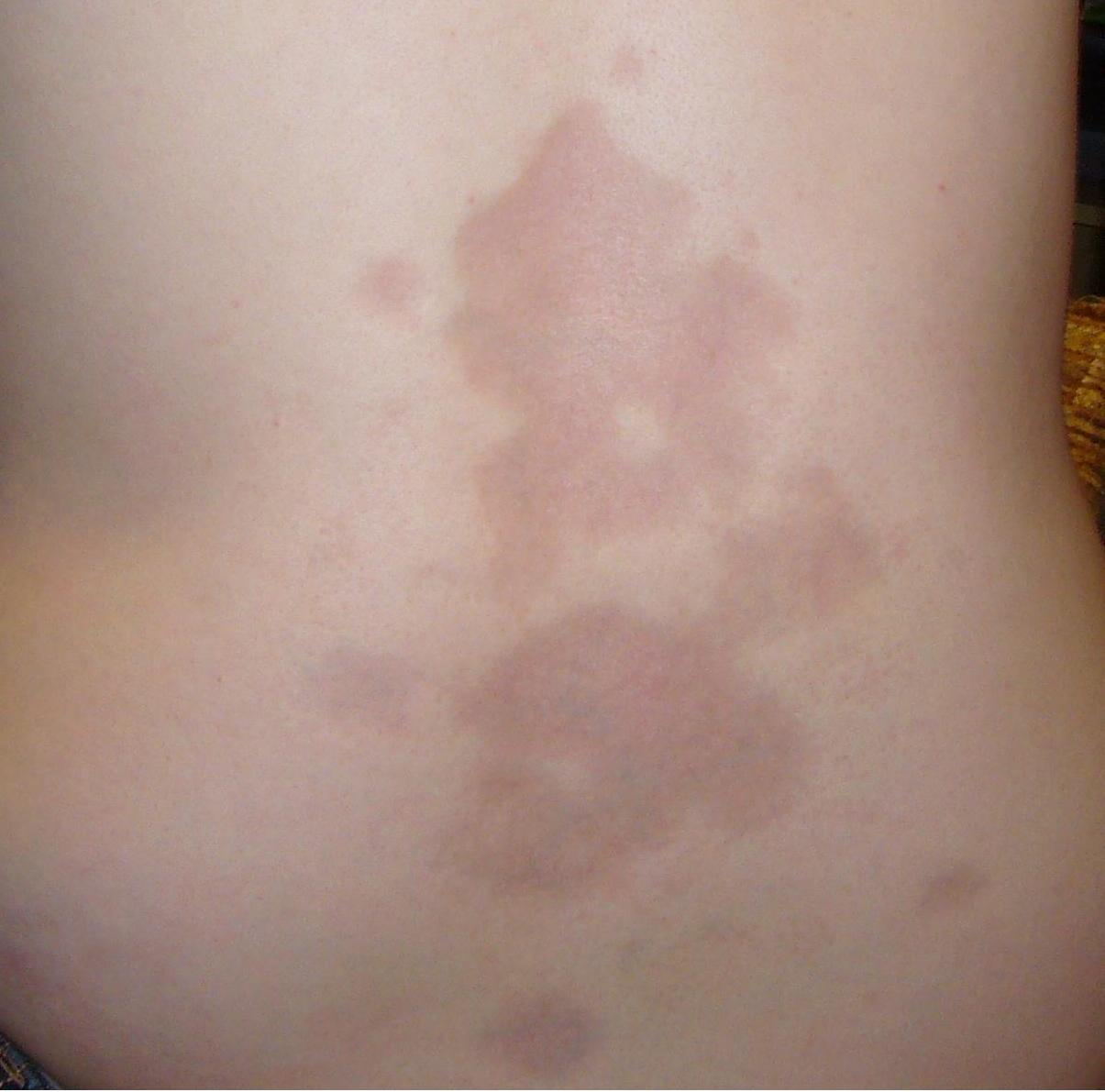
- Specialty: Dermatology

Morphea is a form of scleroderma that mainly involves isolated patches of hardened skin on the face, hands, and feet, or anywhere else on the body, usually with no internal organ involvement. However, in Deep Morphea inflammation and sclerosis can be found in the deep dermis, panniculus, fascia, superficial muscle and bone.

== Signs and symptoms ==
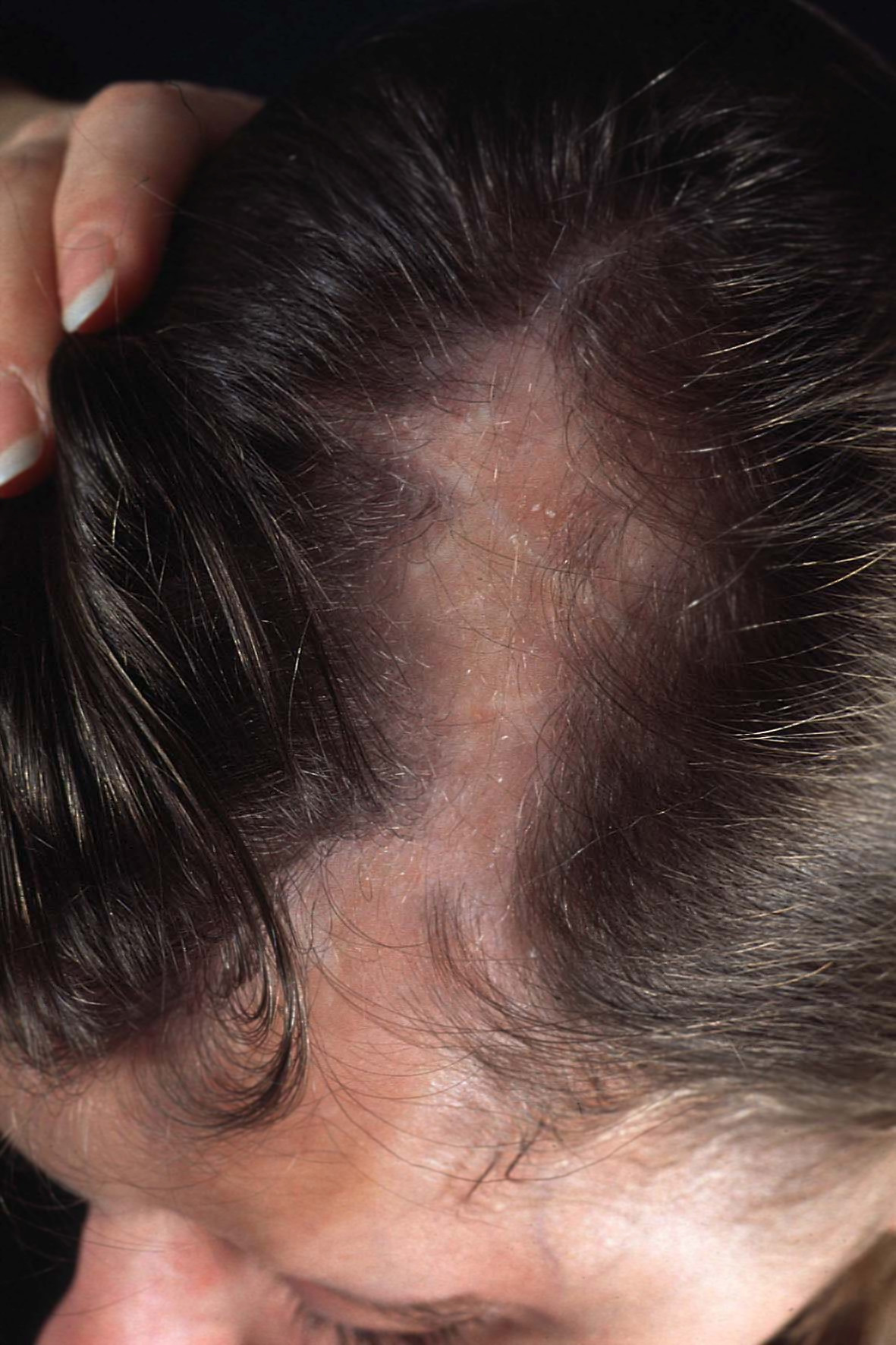
Frontal linear scleroderma

Morphea most often presents as macules or plaques a few centimeters in diameter, but also may occur as bands or in guttate lesions or nodules.

Morphea is a thickening and hardening of the skin and subcutaneous tissues from excessive collagen deposition. Morphea includes specific conditions ranging from very small plaques only involving the skin to widespread disease causing functional and cosmetic deformities. Morphea discriminates from systemic sclerosis by its supposed lack of internal organ involvement. This classification scheme does not include the mixed form of morphea in which different morphologies of skin lesions are present in the same individual. Up to 15% of morphea patients may fall into this previously unrecognized category.

== Cause ==
Physicians and scientists do not know what causes morphea. Case reports and observational studies suggest there is a higher frequency of family history of autoimmune diseases in patients with morphea. Tests for autoantibodies associated with morphea have shown results in higher frequencies of anti-histone and anti-topoisomerase IIa antibodies. Case reports of morphea co-existing with other systemic autoimmune diseases such as primary biliary cirrhosis, vitiligo, and systemic lupus erythematosus lend support to morphea as an autoimmune disease.

Borrelia burgdorferi infection may be relevant for the induction of a distinct autoimmune type of scleroderma; it may be called "Borrelia-associated early onset morphea" and is characterized by the combination of disease onset at younger age, infection with B. burgdorferi, and evident autoimmune phenomena as reflected by high-titer antinuclear antibodies.

== Diagnosis ==
=== Classification ===
- Morphea–lichen sclerosus et atrophicus overlap is characterized by both lesions of morphea and lichen sclerosus et atrophicus, most commonly seen in women.
- Generalized morphea is characterized by widespread indurated plaques and pigmentary changes, sometimes associated with muscle atrophy, but without visceral involvement.
- Morphea profunda involves deep subcutaneous tissue, including fascia, and there is a clinical overlap with eosinophilic fasciitis, eosinophilia-myalgia syndrome, and the Spanish toxic oil syndrome. Morphea profunda shows little response to corticosteroids and tends to run a more chronic debilitating course.
- Pansclerotic morphea is manifested by sclerosis of the dermis, panniculus, fascia, muscle, and at times, the bone, all causing disabling limitation of motion of joints.
- Linear scleroderma is a type of localised scleroderma which is an autoimmune disease characterized by a line of thickened skin which can affect the bones and muscles underneath it. It most often occurs in the arms, legs, or forehead, and may occur in more than one area. It is also most likely to be on just one side of the body. Linear scleroderma generally first appears in young children.
- Frontal linear scleroderma (also known as en coup de sabre or morphea en coup de sabre) is a type of linear scleroderma characterized by a linear band of atrophy and a furrow in the skin that occurs in the frontal or frontoparietal scalp. Multiple lesions of en coup de sabre may coexist in a single patient, with one report suggesting that the lesions followed Blaschko's lines. It gets its name from the perceived similarity to a sabre wound.

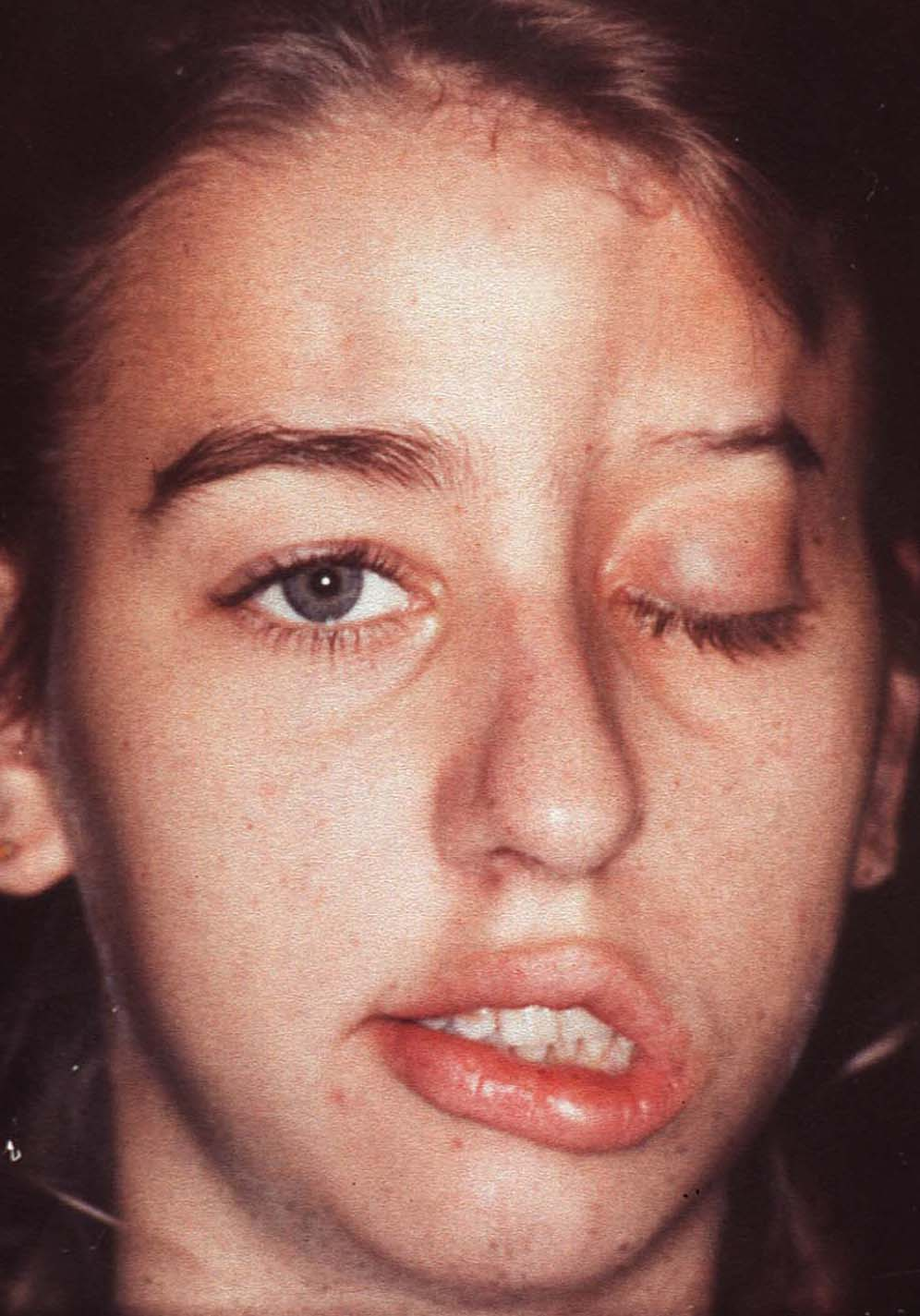
Frontal linear scleroderma

- Atrophoderma of Pasini and Pierini (also known as "Dyschromic and atrophic variation of scleroderma," "Morphea plana atrophica," "Sclérodermie atrophique d'emblée") is a disease characterized by large lesions with a sharp peripheral border dropping into a depression with no outpouching, which, on biopsy, elastin is normal, while collagen may be thickened. Atrophoderma of Pasini and Pierini affects less than 200,000 Americans and is classified as a rare disease by http://rarediseases.info.nih.gov. The disease results in round or oval patches of hyper-pigmented skin. The darkened skin patches may sometimes have a bluish or purplish hue when they first appear and are often smooth to the touch and hairless.

== Treatment ==
Throughout the years, many different treatments have been tried for morphea including topical, intra-lesional, and systemic corticosteroids. Antimalarials such as hydroxychloroquine or chloroquine have been used. Other immunomodulators such as methotrexate, topical tacrolimus, and penicillamine have been tried. Children and teenagers with active morphea (linear scleroderma, generalised morphea and mixed morphea: linear and circumscribed) may experience greater improvement of disease activity or damage with oral methotrexate plus prednisone than with placebo plus prednisone. Some have tried prescription vitamin-D with success. Ultraviolet A (UVA) light, with or without psoralens have also been tried. UVA-1, a more specific wavelength of UVA light, is able to penetrate the deeper portions of the skin and thus, thought to soften the plaques in morphea by acting in two fashions: by causing a systemic immunosuppression from UV light, or by inducing enzymes that naturally degrade the collagen matrix in the skin as part of natural sun-aging of the skin. However, there is limited evidence that UVA‐1 (50 J/cm^{2}), low‐dose UVA‐1 (20 J/cm^{2}), and narrowband UVB differ from each other in effectiveness in treating children and adults with active morphea.

== Epidemiology ==
Morphea is a form of scleroderma that is more common in women than men, in a ratio 3:1. Morphea occurs in childhood as well as in adult life. Morphea is an uncommon condition that is thought to affect 2 to 4 in 100,000 people. Adequate studies on the incidence and prevalence have not been performed. Morphea also may be under-reported, as physicians may be unaware of this disorder, and smaller morphea plaques may be less often referred to a dermatologist or rheumatologist.

== See also ==
- List of cutaneous conditions
