= Fasciitis =

Inflammation process in fascia

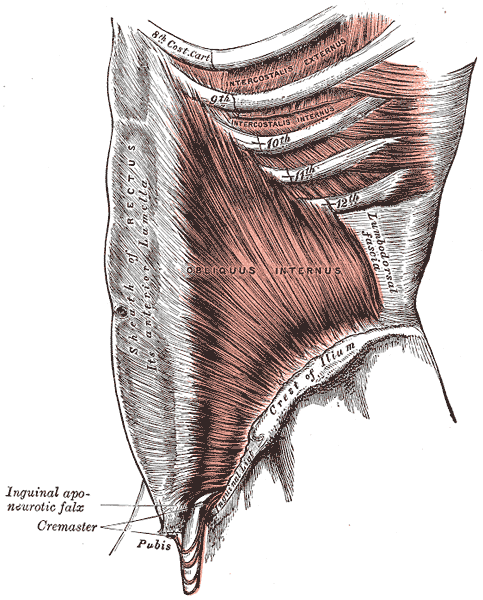
- Fascia
- Pronunciation: /ˌfæʃiˈaɪtɪs/
- Specialty: Rheumatology

Fasciitis is an inflammation of the fascia, which is the connective tissue surrounding muscles, blood vessels and nerves.

Particular forms include:

- Necrotizing fasciitis
- Plantar fasciitis
- Ischemic fasciitis, classified by the World Health Organization, 2020, as a specific tumor form in the category of fibroblastic and myofibroblastic tumors.
- Eosinophilic fasciitis
- Paraneoplastic fasciitis
