= Alefacept =

Genetically engineered immunosuppressive drug

Clinical data
- AHFS/Drugs.com: Monograph
- MedlinePlus: a603011
- Pregnancy category: AU: C
- Routes of administration: Intravenous, intramuscular
- ATC code: L04AA15 (WHO)

Legal status
- Legal status: US: ℞-only

Pharmacokinetic data
- Bioavailability: 63% (IM)
- Elimination half-life: ~270 hours

Identifiers
- IUPAC name: 1-92-LFA-3 (Antigen) (human) fusion protein with immunoglobin G1 (human hinge CH2-CH3γ1-chain) dimer
- CAS Number: 222535-22-0
- DrugBank: DB00092
- ChemSpider: none
- UNII: ELK3V90G6C
- KEGG: D02800
- ChEMBL: ChEMBL1201571

Chemical and physical data
- Formula: C_{2306}H_{3594}N_{610}O_{694}S_{26}
- Molar mass: 51801.25 g·mol^{−1}

Alefacept is a genetically engineered immunosuppressive drug. It was sold under the brand name Amevive in Canada, the United States, Israel, Switzerland and Australia. In 2011, the manufacturers made a decision to cease promotion, manufacturing, distribution and sales of Amevive during a supply disruption. According to Astellas Pharma US, Inc., the decision to cease Amevive sales was neither the result of any specific safety concern nor the result of any FDA-mandated or voluntary product recall. On the other hand, usage of Amevive was associated with a certain risk of development systemic diseases such as malignancies. This drug was never approved for the European drug market.

Alefacept is used to control inflammation in moderate to severe psoriasis with plaque formation, where it interferes with lymphocyte activation. It is also being studied in the treatment of cutaneous T-cell lymphoma and T-cell non-Hodgkin lymphoma.

Alefacept is a fusion protein: it combines part of an antibody with a protein that blocks the growth of some types of T cells.

== Medical uses ==
Alefacept is indicated for the management of patients with moderate to severe chronic plaque psoriasis in adult patients who are candidates for systemic therapy or phototherapy. The concomitant use of low-potency topical corticosteroids was permitted during the treatment phase with alefacept and does not seem to pose any additional risks.

The drug was approved based upon studies involving 1,869 patients altogether with plaques covering at least 10% of body surface. Either 7.5 mg IV or 15 mg IM once a week were applied. The long-term results (reduction of at least 75% in pretreatment PASI scores) were 14% and 21%, respectively. Additional improvements ensuing after completion of the 12-week treatment phase or after completion of a second alefacept treatment were also seen. Often the remissions were maintained for 7 to 12 months after end of treatment.

== Side effects ==
- Lymphopenia : Most common in clinical trials was a significant and dose-related reduction of CD4+ and CD8+ counts in 10 to 59% of patients. However, only 0 to 2% of patients experienced reductions below the accepted lower limit. Consequences of lymphopenia may be infections and/or treatment related malignancies (see below).
- Malignancies : In clinical studies among 1,869 patients 63 treatment-emerged malignancies in 43 patients were observed. Most of these were nonmelanoma and melanoma skin cancers, other solid tumors, and lymphomas.
- Infections : In clinical studies 0.9% of patients experienced significant infections compared to 0.2% in the placebo group. Among the infections were serious ones such as sepsis, pneumonia, abscesses, wound infections and toxic shock syndrome.
- Sensitivity reactions: Urticaria and angioedema were observed. If an anaphylactic reaction should occur symptomatic treatment should be initiated at once.
- Forming of antibodies to alefacept : About 3% of patients developed low-titer antibodies with unknown importance for the clinical efficiency of the drug. Long-term immune effects have not been well explored.
- Hepatic Toxicity : Postmarketing reports revealed asymptomatic increases in transaminases (ALT and/or AST), fatty liver degeneration, decompensation of preexisting liver cirrhosis, and acute treatment-related liver failure. It is not known if some or all of these manifestations are attributable to alefacept-therapy, but it is recommended to discontinue therapy as soon as any sign of liver toxicity develops.
- Different Common Side Effects : side effects such as pharyngitis, cough, dizziness, nausea, pruritus, myalgias, chills, and reactions at injection sites were observed quite frequently.

=== Contraindications and precautions ===
- Alefacept reduces CD4^{+} T cell counts and may worsen the clinical course of HIV infections. It is therefore contraindicated in patients with HIV infections.
- Pretreatment CD4^{+} and/or CD8^{+} cell counts below the accepted lower limit
- History of systemic malignancy
- Caution: Patients at high risk to develop a systemic malignancy
- Known hypersensitivity to alefacept or to any other ingredient of the preparation
- Caution: There is little experience in geriatric patients (65 years of age or older); so far no differences to the younger age group have been noted.

== Pregnancy and lactation ==
- Alefacept has been assigned to Pregnancy Category B in the US and to C in Australia.
- Lactation : It is not known if the drug is excreted into human milk. Either the drug or breastfeeding should be terminated, taking into account the importance of treatment to the mother.

== Children ==
No clinical experience exists in patients under 18 years of age. The drug should therefore not be used in pediatric patients.

== Interactions ==
- Patients currently undergoing immunosuppressive therapy (phototherapy, or concomitant application of other immunosuppressant agents) should not receive alefacept to avoid the risks of excessive immunosuppression. Studies concerning the combination with cyclosporine or methotrexate are conducted, but no results have been published so far.
- Live vaccines: The efficiency of concomitant application of live vaccines has not been fully examined yet. However, the effect of tetanus toxoid was well preserved in clinical trials.

== Laboratory testing ==
- CD4^{+} cell counts should be obtained before initiation of therapy and during the 12-week course of therapy in intervals of 2 weeks.
- It may be desirable to monitor liver function studies (AST and ALT) in patients at high risk to develop liver toxicity (e.g., preexisting hepatitis, or high daily consumption of alcohol).

== Dosage ==
The standard dosage regimen is the weekly application of either 7.5 mg IV or 15 mg IM for a course of 12 weeks. The benefits and risks of repeated courses have not been explored in sufficient detail. Therapy should be conducted under the supervision of a physician experienced in the use of immunosuppressant agents.

== Mechanism of action ==
The mechanism of action involves dual mechanisms. Alefacept inhibits the activation of CD4^{+} and CD8^{+} T cells by interfering with CD2 on the T cell membrane thereby blocking the costimulatory molecule LFA-3/CD2 interaction. Another mechanism is inducing apoptosis of memory-effector T lymphocytes. If the T cells were to become activated they would stimulate proliferation of keratinocytes resulting in the typical psoriatic symptoms. Therefore, alefacept leads to clinical improvement of moderate to severe psoriasis by blunting these reactions. Combinations of therapeutic modalities have been utilized to meet the challenge of difficult to treat psoriasis.

== Withdrawal ==
Due to availability of better tolerated and more efficacious molecules for psoriasis, alefacept was withdrawn from use by its sponsor in 2011.
