= Pressure ulcer =

Skin damage resulting from long-term pressure

- Other names: Decubitus (plural: decubitūs), or decubitous ulcers, pressure injuries, pressure sores, bedsores
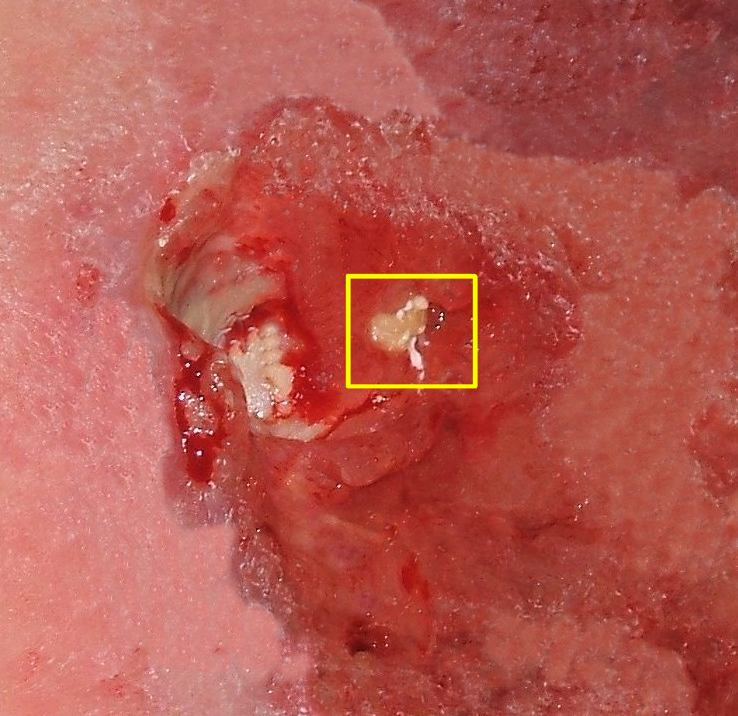
- Stage IV decubitus displaying the tuberosity of the ischium protruding through the tissue, and possible onset of osteomyelitis
- Specialty: Plastic surgery
- Complications: Infection

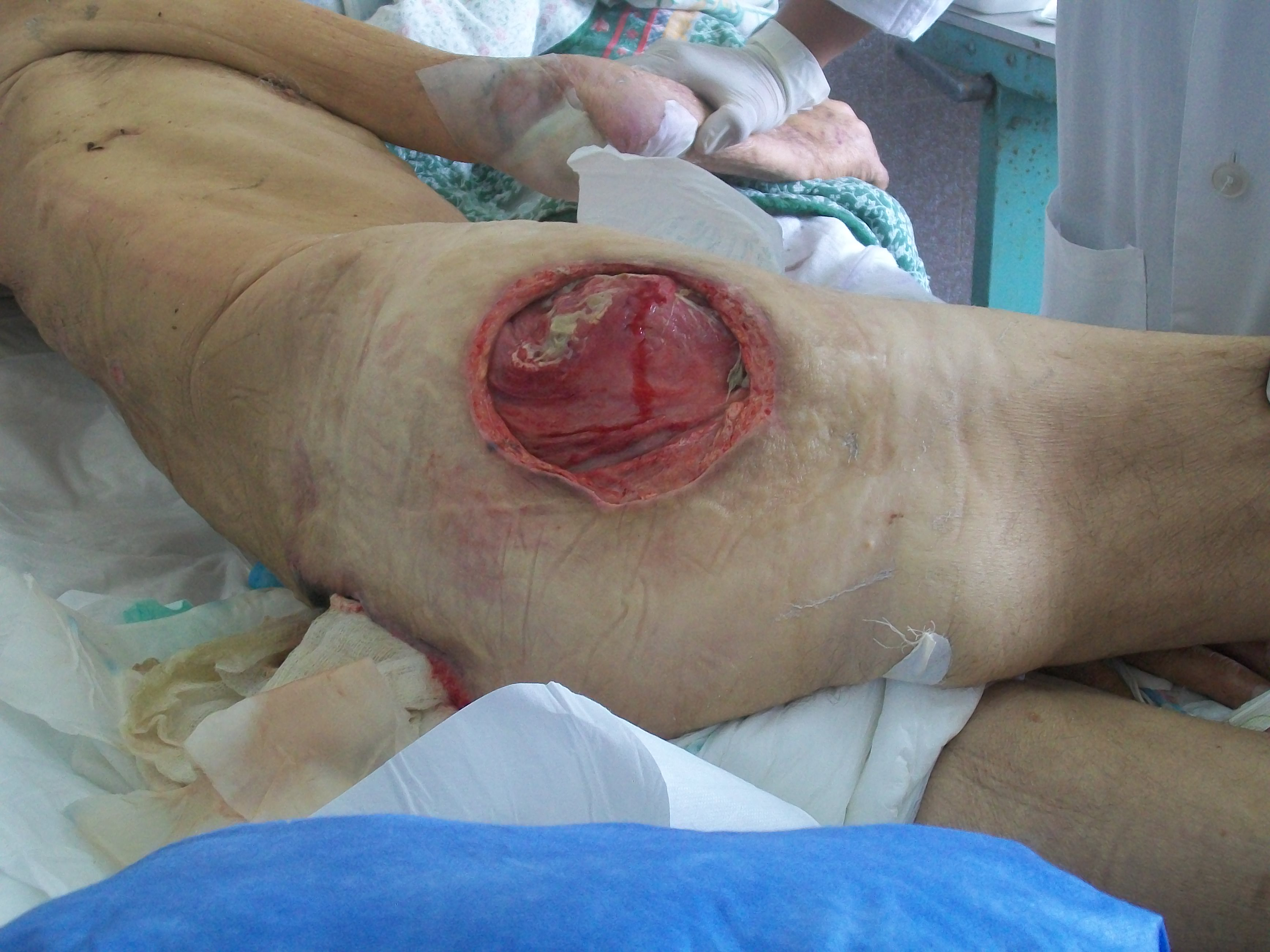
Stage IV pressure ulcer caused by prolonged decubitus, exposing the gluteus medius muscle attached to the iliac crest

Pressure ulcers, also known as pressure sores, bed sores or pressure injuries, are localised damage to the skin and/or underlying tissue that usually occurs over a bony prominence as a result of usually long-term pressure, or pressure in combination with shear or friction. The most common sites are the skin overlying the sacrum, coccyx, heels, and hips, though other sites can be affected, such as the elbows, knees, ankles, back of shoulders, or the back of the cranium.

Pressure ulcers occur due to pressure applied to soft tissue which results in completely or partially obstructed blood flow to the soft tissue. Shear is also a cause, as it can pull on blood vessels that feed the skin. Pressure ulcers most commonly develop in individuals who are not moving about, such as those who are on chronic bedrest or consistently use a wheelchair. It is widely believed that other factors can influence the tolerance of skin for pressure and shear, thereby increasing the risk of pressure ulcer development. These factors are protein-calorie malnutrition, microclimate (skin wetness caused by sweating or incontinence), diseases that reduce blood flow to the skin, such as arteriosclerosis, or diseases that reduce the sensation in the skin, such as paralysis or neuropathy. The healing of pressure ulcers may be slowed by a person's age, medical conditions (such as arteriosclerosis, diabetes or infection), smoking or medications such as anti-inflammatory drugs.

Although often prevented and treatable if detected early, pressure ulcers can be very difficult to prevent in critically ill people, frail elders, and individuals with impaired mobility such as wheelchair users (especially where spinal injury is involved). Primary prevention is to redistribute pressure by regularly turning the person. The benefit of turning to avoid further sores is well documented since at least the 19th century. In addition to turning and re-positioning the person in the bed or wheelchair, eating a balanced diet with adequate protein and keeping the skin free from exposure to urine and stool is important.

The rate of pressure ulcers in hospital settings is high; the prevalence in European hospitals ranges from 8.3% to 23%, and the prevalence was 26% in Canadian healthcare settings from 1990 to 2003. In 2013, there were 29,000 documented deaths from pressure ulcers globally, up from 14,000 deaths in 1990.

The United States has tracked rates of pressure injury since the early 2000s. Whittington and Briones reported nationwide rates of pressure injuries in hospitals of 6% to 8%. By the early 2010s, one study showed the rate of pressure injury had dropped to about 4.5% across the Medicare population following the introduction of the International Guideline for pressure injury prevention. Padula and colleagues have witnessed a +29% uptick in pressure injury rates in recent years associated with the rollout of penalizing Medicare policies.

== Presentation ==
=== Complications ===
Pressure ulcers can trigger other ailments, cause considerable suffering, and can be expensive to treat. Some complications include autonomic dysreflexia, bladder distension, bone infection, pyarthrosis, sepsis, amyloidosis, anemia, urethral fistula, gangrene and very rarely malignant transformation (Marjolin's ulcer – secondary carcinomas in chronic wounds). Sores may recur if those with pressure ulcers do not follow recommended treatment or may instead develop seromas, hematomas, infections, or wound dehiscence. Paralyzed individuals are the most likely to have pressure sores recur. In some cases, complications from pressure sores can be life-threatening. The most common causes of fatality stem from kidney failure and amyloidosis. Pressure ulcers are also painful, with individuals of all ages and all stages of pressure ulcers reporting pain.

== Cause ==
There are four mechanisms that contribute to pressure ulcer development:

1. External (interface) pressure applied over an area of the body, especially over the bony prominences can result in obstruction of the blood capillaries, which deprives tissues of oxygen and nutrients, causing ischemia (deficiency of blood in a particular area), hypoxia (inadequate amount of oxygen available to the cells), edema, inflammation, and, finally, necrosis and ulcer formation. Ulcers due to external pressure occur over the sacrum and coccyx, followed by the trochanter and the calcaneus (heel). In healthy individuals, ulcers caused by external pressure do not occur when the body is stationary, such as during sleep, as involuntary movements of the body frequently occur, allowing for repositioning and the relief of pressure.
2. Friction is damaging to the superficial blood vessels directly under the skin. It occurs when two surfaces rub against each other. The skin over the elbows can be injured due to friction. The back can also be injured when patients are pulled or slid over bed sheets while being moved up in bed or transferred onto a stretcher.
3. Shearing is a separation of the skin from underlying tissues. When a patient is partially sitting up in bed, skin may stick to the sheet, making the skin susceptible to shearing in case underlying tissues move downward with the body toward the foot of the bed. This may also be possible on a patient who slides down while sitting in a chair.
4. Moisture is also a common pressure ulcer culprit. Sweat, urine, feces, or excessive wound drainage can further exacerbate the damage done by pressure, friction, and shear. It can contribute to maceration of surrounding skin thus potentially expanding the deleterious effects of pressure ulcers.

=== Risk factors ===
There are over 100 risk factors for pressure ulcers. Factors that may place a patient at risk include immobility, diabetes mellitus, peripheral vascular disease, malnutrition, cerebral vascular accident and hypotension. Other factors are age of 70 years and older, current smoking history, dry skin, low body mass index, urinary and fecal incontinence, physical restraints, malignancy, vasopressin prescription, and history of prior pressure injury development.

== Pathophysiology ==
Pressure ulcers may be caused by inadequate blood supply and resulting reperfusion injury when blood re-enters tissue. A simple example of a mild pressure sore may be experienced by healthy individuals while sitting in the same position for extended periods of time: the dull ache experienced is indicative of impeded blood flow to affected areas. Within two hours, this shortage of blood supply, called ischemia, may lead to tissue damage and cell death. The sore initially starts as a red, painful area. The other process of pressure ulcer development is seen when pressure is high enough to damage the cell membrane of muscle cells. The muscle cells die as a result and skin fed through blood vessels coming through the muscle die. This is the deep tissue injury form of pressure ulcers, and begins as purple intact skin.

According to Centers for Medicare and Medicaid Services, pressure ulcers are one of the eight preventable iatrogenic illnesses. If a pressure ulcer is acquired in the hospital, the hospital will no longer receive reimbursement for the person's care. Hospitals spend about $27 billion annually for treatment of pressure injuries. Whereas, the cost of pressure injury prevention is cost-effective, if not cost-saving, and would cost less than half the amount of resources to prevent compared to treat in health systems.

=== Sites ===
Pressure ulcer points. Red: in supine position. Blue: in side-lying position.

Common pressure sore sites include the skin over the coccyx, the sacrum, the ischia/ischium, the heels of the feet, over the heads of the long bones of the foot, buttocks, over the shoulder, and over the back of the head.

=== Pressure reduction ===
Pressure must be removed from high risk body areas by frequent changes in position in bed or chair, including turning side to side. Chair cushions and air mattresses should be used for immobile patients. Heels should be off of the bed.

=== Adequate diet ===
Eating by mouth is preferred and intake of food and fluid should meet calorie, protein and fluid needs. Work with a dietician if needed. Supplements may be needed.

=== Biofilm ===
Biofilm is one of the most common reasons for delayed healing in pressure ulcers. Biofilm occurs rapidly in wounds and stalls healing by keeping the wound inflamed. Frequent debridement and antimicrobial dressings are needed to control the biofilm. Infection prevents the healing of pressure ulcers. Signs of pressure ulcer infection include slow or delayed healing and pale granulation tissue. Signs and symptoms of systemic infection include fever, pain, redness, swelling, warmth of the area, and purulent discharge. Additionally, infected wounds may have a gangrenous smell, be discolored, and may eventually produce more pus.

In order to eliminate this problem, it is imperative to apply antiseptics at once. Hydrogen peroxide (a near-universal toxin) is not recommended for this task as it increases inflammation and impedes healing. Cleaning the open wound with hypochlorous acid is helpful. Dressings with cadexomer iodine, silver, or honey have been shown to penetrate bacterial biofilms. Systemic antibiotics are not recommended in treating local infection in a pressure ulcer, as it can lead to bacterial resistance. They are only recommended if there is evidence of advancing cellulitis, bony infection, or bacteria in the blood.

== Diagnosis ==
=== Classification ===
Stages I to IV of a pressure ulcer

The definitions of the pressure ulcer stages are revised periodically by the National Pressure Injury Advisory Panel (NPIAP) in the United States and the European Pressure Ulcer Advisory Panel (EPUAP) in Europe. Different classification systems are used around the world, depending upon the health system, the health discipline and the purpose for the classifying (e.g. health care versus, prevalence studies versus funding. Briefly, they are as follows:

- Stage 1: Intact skin with non-blanchable redness of a localized area usually over a bony prominence. Darkly pigmented skin may not have visible blanching; its color may differ from the surrounding area. The area differs in characteristics such as thickness and temperature as compared to adjacent tissue. Stage 1 may be difficult to detect in individuals with dark skin tones. May indicate "at risk" persons (a heralding sign of risk).
- Stage 2: Partial thickness loss of dermis presenting as a shallow open ulcer with a red pink wound bed, without slough. May also present as an intact or open/ruptured serum-filled blister. Presents as a shiny or dry shallow ulcer without slough or bruising. This stage should not be used to describe skin tears, tape burns, perineal dermatitis, maceration or excoriation.
- Stage 3: Full thickness tissue loss. Subcutaneous fat may be visible but bone, tendon or muscle are not exposed. Slough may be present but does not obscure the depth of tissue loss. May include undermining and tunneling. The depth of a stage 3 pressure ulcer varies by anatomical location. The bridge of the nose, ear, occiput and malleolus do not have (adipose) subcutaneous tissue and stage 3 ulcers can be shallow. In contrast, areas of significant adiposity can develop extremely deep stage 3 pressure ulcers. Bone/tendon is not visible or directly palpable.
- Stage 4: Full thickness tissue loss with exposed bone, tendon or muscle. Slough or eschar may be present on some parts of the wound bed. Often include undermining and tunneling. The depth of a stage 4 pressure ulcer varies by anatomical location. The bridge of the nose, ear, occiput and malleolus do not have (adipose) subcutaneous tissue and these ulcers can be shallow. Stage 4 ulcers can extend into muscle and/or supporting structures (e.g., fascia, tendon or joint capsule) making osteomyelitis likely to occur. Exposed bone/tendon is visible or directly palpable. In 2012, the National Pressure Injury Advisory Panel stated that pressure ulcers with exposed cartilage are also classified as a stage 4.
- Unstageable: Full thickness tissue loss in which actual depth of the ulcer is completely obscured by slough (yellow, tan, gray, green or brown) and/or eschar (tan, brown or black) in the wound bed. Until enough slough and/or eschar is removed to expose the base of the wound, the true depth, and therefore stage, cannot be determined. Stable (dry, adherent, intact without erythema or fluctuance) eschar on the heels is normally protective and should not be removed.
- Deep tissue pressure injury (formerly suspected deep tissue injury): Intact or non-intact skin with localized area of persistent non-blanchable deep red, maroon, purple discoloration or epidermal separation revealing a dark wound bed or blood filled blister. Pain and temperature change often precede skin color changes. Discoloration may appear differently in darkly pigmented skin. This injury results from intense and/or prolonged pressure and shear forces at the bone-muscle interface. The wound may evolve rapidly to reveal the actual extent of tissue injury, or may resolve without tissue loss. If necrotic tissue, subcutaneous tissue, granulation tissue, fascia, muscle or other underlying structures are visible, this indicates a full thickness pressure injury (Unstageable, Stage 3 or Stage 4). Do not use DTPI to describe vascular, traumatic, neuropathic, or dermatologic conditions.

The term medical device related pressure ulcer refers to a cause rather than a classification. Pressure ulcers from a medical device are classified according to the same classification system being used for pressure ulcers arising from other causes, but the cause is usually noted. Pressure injury from medical devices on mucous membranes should not be staged.

=== Ischemic fasciitis ===
Ischemic fasciitis (IF) is a benign tumor in the class of fibroblastic and myofibroblastic tumors that, like pressure ulcers, may develop in elderly, bed-ridden individuals. These tumors commonly form in the subcutaneous tissues (i.e. lower most tissue layer of the skin) that overlie bony protuberances such as those in or around the hip, shoulder, greater trochanter of the femur, iliac crest, lumbar region, or scapular region. IF tumors differ from pressure ulcers in that they typically do not have extensive ulcerations of the skin and on histopathological microscopic analysis lack evidence of acute inflammation as determined by the presence of various types of white blood cells. These tumors are commonly treated by surgical removal.

== Prevention ==
There are various approaches that are used widely for preventing pressure ulcers. Suggested approaches include modifications to bedding and mattresses, different support systems for taking pressure off of affected areas, airing of surfaces of the body, skin care, nutrition, and organizational modifications (for example, changing the care routines in hospitals or homes where people require extended bedrest). Overall, unbiased clinical studies to determine the effectiveness of these types of interventions and to determine the most effective intervention are needed in order to best prevent pressure ulcers.

=== Clinical guidelines for preventing pressure ulcers ===
Numerous evidence-based and expert consensus-based clinical guidelines have been to developed to help guide medical professionals internationally and in specific countries including the UK. The Standardized Pressure Injury Prevention Protocol (SPIPP) Checklist is a derivative of the International Guideline that was designed to facilitate consistent implementation of pressure injury prevention. In 2022, United States Congress passed legislation updating the Military Construction and Veterans Affairs and Related Agencies Appropriations Act, 2015 (H.R. 4355) to establish the SPIPP Checklist as law that United States Department of Veterans Affairs (VA) facilities should adhere to in order to keep patients safe from harm.

=== Risk assessment ===
Before turning and repositioning a person, a risk assessment tool is suggested to determine what is the best approach for preventing pressure ulcers in that person. Some of the most common risk assessment tools are the Braden Scale, Norton, or Waterlow tools. The type of risk assessment tool that is used, will depend on which hospital the patient is admitted to and the location. After the risk assessment tool is used, a plan will be developed for the patient individually to prevent Hospital-Acquired Pressure Injuries. This plan will consist of different turning and repositioning strategies. These risk assessment tools provide the nursing staff with a baseline for each patient regarding their individual risk for acquiring a pressure injury. Factors that contribute to these risk assessment tools are moisture, activity, and mobility. These factors are considered and scored using the scale being used, whether it be the Braden, Norton, or Waterlow scale. The numbers are then added up and based on that final number, a score will be given and appropriate measures will be taken to ensure that the patient is being properly repositioned. However, this is not always completed in hospitals like it should be.

Efforts in the United States and South Korea have sought to automate risk assessment and classification by training machine learning models on electronic health records.

=== Redistribution of pressure ===
An important aspect of care for most people at risk for pressure ulcers and those with bedsores is the redistribution of pressure so that no pressure is applied to the pressure ulcer. In the 1940s Ludwig Guttmann introduced a program of turning paraplegics every two hours thus allowing bedsores to heal. Previously such individuals had a two-year life-expectancy, normally succumbing to blood and skin infections. Guttmann had learned the technique from the work of Boston physician Donald Munro. There is lack of evidence on prevention of pressure ulcer whether the patient is put in 30 degrees position or at the standard 90 degrees position.

Nursing homes and hospitals usually set programs in place to avoid the development of pressure ulcers in those who are bedridden, such as using a routine time frame for turning and repositioning to reduce pressure. The frequency of turning and repositioning depends on the person's level of risk.

Various interventions have been developed to redistribute pressure, including the use of different bed mattresses, support surfaces, and the use of static chairs.

==== Support surfaces ====
The use of different types of mattresses, including high density foam, surfaces with reactive fibers or gels in them, and surfaces that incorporate reactive water, it sometimes suggested to redistribute pressure. The evidence supporting these interventions and whether they prevent new ulcers, increase the comfort level, or have other positive or more negative adverse effects is weak. Many support surfaces redistribute pressure by immersing and/or enveloping the body into the surface. Some support surfaces, including antidecubitus mattresses and cushions, contain multiple air chambers that are alternately pumped. Methods to standardize the products and evaluate the efficacy of these products have only been developed in recent years through the work of the S3I within NPUAP.

There is some evidence that the use of foam mattresses is not as effective as support approaches that include alternating pressure air surfaces or reactive surfaces. It is not clear if interventions that include a reactive air surface are more effective than reactive surfaces that include water or gel or other substrates. In addition, the effectiveness of sheepskin overlays on top of mattresses is not clear.

Evidence is uncertain regarding which support surfaces are most effective for pressure ulcer healing. While reactive air surfaces may promote healing more effectively than foam in some cases, the evidence is limited and inconsistent.

Static chairs (as opposed to wheelchairs) have also been suggested for pressure redistribution. Static chairs can include: standard hospital chairs; chairs with no cushions or manual/dynamic function; and chairs with integrated pressure redistributing surfaces and recline, rise or tilt functions. More research is needed to establish how effective pressure redistributing static chairs are for preventing pressure ulcers.

For individuals with limited mobility, pressure shifting on a regular basis and using a wheelchair cushion featuring pressure relief components can help prevent pressure wounds.

=== Nutrition ===
The benefits of nutritional interventions with various compositions for pressure ulcer prevention are uncertain.

=== Organisational changes ===
There is some suggestion that organisational changes may reduce incidence of pressure ulcers, with healthcare professionals central to the prevention of pressure ulcers in both hospital and community settings. It is not clear from studies on the effectiveness of these approaches as to the best organisational change that would benefit those at risk of pressure ulcers including organisation of health services, risk assessment tools, wound care teams, and education. This is largely due to the lack of high-quality research in these areas.

=== Wound care and dressings ===
Caring for wounds and ulcers that have been started and the use of creams are also considerations in preventing worsening to ulcers and new primary ulcers. It is unclear if creams containing fatty acids are effective in reducing incidence of pressure ulcers compared to creams without fatty acids. It is also unclear if silicone dressings reduce pressure ulcer incidence. There is no evidence that massage reduces pressure ulcer incidence. Controlling the heat and moisture levels of the skin surface, known as skin microclimate management, may also play a role in the prevention and control of pressure ulcers. Skin care is also important because damaged skin does not tolerate pressure. However, skin that is damaged by exposure to urine or stool is not considered a pressure ulcer. These skin wounds should be classified as Incontinence Associated Dermatitis.

== Treatment ==
Recommendations to treat pressure ulcers include the use of bed rest, pressure redistributing support surfaces, nutritional support, repositioning, wound care (e.g., debridement, wound dressings) and biophysical agents (e.g., electrical stimulation). Reliable scientific evidence to support the use of many of these interventions, though, is lacking. More research is needed to assess how to best support the treatment of pressure ulcers, for example by repositioning.

=== Debridement ===
Necrotic tissue should be removed in most pressure ulcers. The heel is an exception in many cases when the limb has an inadequate blood supply. Necrotic tissue is an ideal area for bacterial growth, which has the ability to greatly compromise wound healing. There are five ways to remove necrotic tissue.

- Autolytic debridement is the use of moist dressings to promote autolysis with the body's own enzymes and white blood cells. This is a slow process, but mostly painless, and is most effective in individuals with a properly functioning immune system.
- Biological debridement, or maggot debridement therapy, is the use of medical maggots to feed on necrotic tissue and therefore clean the wound of excess bacteria. Although this fell out of favor for many years, in January 2004, the FDA approved maggots as a live medical device.
- Chemical debridement, or enzymatic debridement, is the use of prescribed enzymes that promote the removal of necrotic tissue.
- Mechanical debridement is the use of debriding dressings, whirlpool or ultrasound for slough in a stable wound.
- Surgical debridement, or sharp debridement, is the fastest method, as it allows a surgeon to quickly remove dead tissue.

=== Dressings ===
It is not clear if one topical agent or dressing is better than another for treating pressure ulcers. There is some evidence to suggest that protease-modulating dressings, foam dressings or collagenase ointment may be better at healing than gauze. The wound dressing should be selected based on the wound and condition of the surrounding skin. There are some studies that indicate that antimicrobial products that stimulate the epithelization may improve the wound healing. However, there is no international consensus on the selection of the dressings for pressure ulcers. Evidence supporting the use of alginate dressings, foam dressings, and hydrogel dressings, and the benefits of these dressings over other treatments is unclear.

Some guidelines for dressing are:

| Condition | Cover dressing |
|---|---|
| None to moderate exudates | Gauze with tape or composite |
| Moderate to heavy exudates | Foam dressing with tape or composite |
| Frequent soiling | Hydrocolloid dressing, film or composite |
| Fragile skin | Stretch gauze or stretch net |

=== Other treatments ===
Other treatments include anabolic steroids, medical grade honey, negative pressure wound therapy, phototherapy, pressure relieving devices, reconstructive surgery, support surfaces, ultrasound and topical phenytoin. There is little or no evidence to support or refute the benefits of most of these treatments compared to each other and placebo. It is not clear if electrical stimulation is an effective treatment for pressure ulcers. In addition, the benefit of using systemic or topical antibiotics in the management of pressure ulcer is still unclear. When selecting treatments, consideration should be given to patients' quality of life as well as the interventions' ease of use, reliability, and cost. The benefits of nutritional interventions with various compositions for pressure ulcer treatment are uncertain.

== Epidemiology ==
Each year, more than 2.5 million people in the United States develop pressure ulcers. In acute care settings in the United States, the incidence of bedsores is 0.4% to 38%; within long-term care it is 2.2% to 23.9%, and in home care, it is 0% to 17%. Similarly, there is wide variation in prevalence: 10% to 18% in acute care, 2.3% to 28% in long-term care, and 0% to 29% in home care. There is a much higher rate of bedsores in intensive care units because of immunocompromised individuals, with 8% to 40% of those in the ICU developing bedsores. However, pressure ulcer prevalence is highly dependent on the methodology used to collect the data. Using the European Pressure Ulcer Advisory Panel (EPUAP) methodology there are similar figures for pressure ulcers in acutely sick people in the hospital. There are differences across countries, but using this methodology, pressure ulcer prevalence in Europe was consistently high, from 8.3% (Italy) to 22.9% (Sweden). A recent study in Jordan also showed a figure in this range. Some research shows differences in pressure-ulcer detection among white and black residents in nursing homes.

== See also ==
- Perfusion – systemic biomechanics of blood delivery
