= Pachydermatous eosinophilic dermatitis =

Skin condition

- Specialty: Dermatology

Pachydermatous eosinophilic dermatitis is a skin condition observed in South African black teenage girls and characterized by generalized pruritic papules, hypertrophic genital lesions and peripheral eosinophilia.

== See also ==
- Keloid morphea
- List of cutaneous conditions
