= Ischemic fasciitis =

- Other names: Atypical decubital fibroplasia, decubital ischemic fasciitis
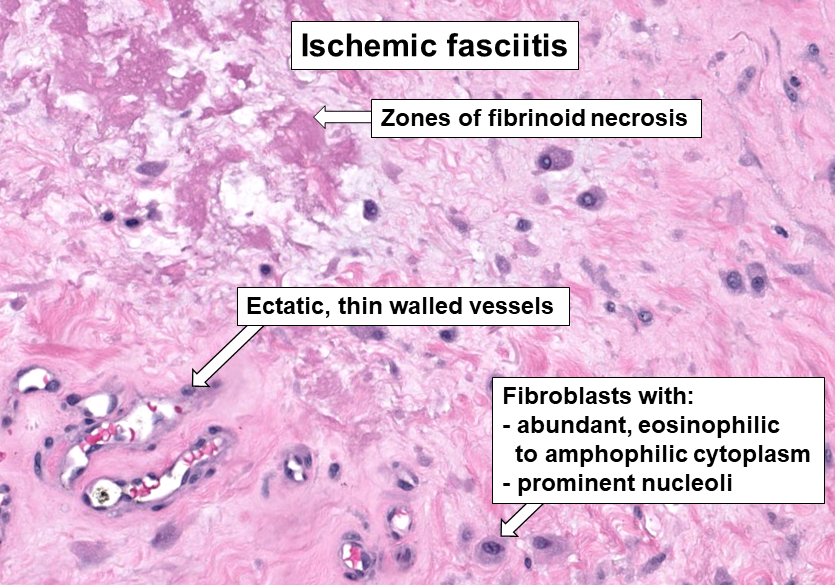
- Histopathology of ischemic fasciitis, with typical features
- Specialty: Dermatology, Dermatopathology, General Surgery
- Causes: Unknown
- Treatment: Surgical removal or long-term observation
- Prognosis: Completely benign tumor
- Frequency: Rare
- Deaths: None

Ischemic fasciities (IF), also termed atypical decubital fibroplasia or decubital ischemic fasciitis, is a rare pseudosarcomatous (i.e. easily mistaken for a sarcoma) tumor. It was first described by E. A. Montgomery et al. in 1992. This tumor typically forms in the subcutaneous tissues (i.e. lower most tissue layer of the skin) that overlie bony protuberances such as a hip in individuals who are debilitated and bed-ridden.

Microscopically, IF lesions consist of proliferating, atypical fibroblasts and/or myofibroblasts. The lesions were initially regarded as non-neoplastic proliferation responses of these cell types to long-term tissue pressure or trauma. More recently, however, the World Health Organization, 2020, defined IF lesions as neoplasms, i.e. tissue growths which are uncoordinated with that of the normal surrounding tissue and persist in growing even if the original trigger for their development is removed. The Organization formally classified IF lesions as belonging to the category of benign fibroblastic and myofibroblastic tumors.

The treatment of choice for these often disfiguring, uncomfortable, and/or painful IF tumors is generally conservative, local surgical excision. It is critically important that these benign tumors be distinguished from other fasciitis tumors as well as certain sarcomas which can be highly invasive and/or malignant and therefor require far more aggressive treatment.

== Presentation ==
In the original study of IF, individuals diagnosed with the disorder were women (16 cases) or men (12 cases) age 15 to 95 years; In a more recent study, diagnosed individuals were women (15 cases) or men (29 cases) aged 23–96 years old. Most individuals in these two studies were in their 8th or 9th decade when diagnosed with IF and, overall, had a relatively long history of being invalided, immobilized, and/or bed-ridden due to other disorders such as severe osteoarthritis, rheumatoid arthritis, chronic renal failure, chronic obstructive pulmonary disease, cancer, or dementia. In the study of 44 individuals, however, an appreciable number of patients did not have a history of debilitation. Some individuals reported that they had prior trauma in the areas where their lesions developed.

Individuals present with a painless or painful and sometimes disabling slowly growing mass that is ill-defined, located in deep subcutaneous tissues, and, rarely, has spread into an adjacent skeletal muscle or tendon. The masses vary from 1.3 to 10 cm in maximum diameter. In the study of 44 cases, 76.7% of the tumors were located around the base of a hip (11 cases), shoulder (7 cases), or greater trochanter of the femur; 4 were in a hip joint, 4 in a thigh, 3 in the iliac crest, 2 in a buttock, and 1 each in the lumbar region, scapular region, or a deltoid muscle; in the remaining cases, ~11.2% of the tumors were on the chest wall away from the shoulders and ~11.2% were on the back. Typically, the tumors reside over boney protuberances which, it is thought, provide the mechanical pressures that cause poor blood flow to nearby subcutaneous tissues, aberrant wound healing in these tissues, and thereby the development of IF.

== Pathology ==
On gross examination, IF tumors are typically white-yellow masses with central necrosis (i.e. areas of dead or dying cells), and areas containing cysts and/or old, dried hemorrhages. The tumors are often poorly circumscribed, have an infiltrative appearance, may be multinodular, and lie in subcutaneous tissue but may also involve the dermal layer of the skin and/or the reticular dermis. Microscopic histopathological studies of IF tissues report the characteristic presence of a distinct zonal appearance, i.e. the presence of central zones of fibrinoid necrosis and areas of cyst-laden necrosis in a hypocellular background surrounding by a zone of granulation tissue (i.e. connective tissue containing microscopic blood vessels) populated by atypical, swollen fibroblasts, myofibroblasts, and/or macrophages.

Immunohistochemistry analyses of IF tumors often show the presence of fibroblasts, fibroblast-like cells, and or other types of cells that in a percentage of cases express smooth muscle actin proteins, CD68 protein,. desmin protein, vimentin protein, and collagen type IV protein, but not keratin, S100, calponin, or CD34 proteins. The finding that a tumor's cells have some of these patterns of protein expression can help support the diagnosis of IF.

== Gene and chromosome abnormalities ==
A single case of IF was found to have tumor cells bearing chromosomal translocations between chromosomes 1 and 2 and/or chromosomes 7 and 19. While further studies are needed to confirm these finding and to conduct further gene and chromosome analyses, these results support the notion that IF tumors are neoplasms rather than purely reactive lesions.

== Diagnosis ==
IF tumors have features which overlap other types of fasciitis disorders such as proliferative fasciitis and nodular fasciitis. However, the age, history of debilitation, tumor location over boney protuberances, and tumor histopathology of having two distinctly different zones tend to distinguish IF from these two as well as the following tumors. Decubitus ulcers, i.e. common bed sores, differ from IF in typically having extensive ulcerations of the skin and histopathological evidence of acute inflammation as determined by the presence of various types of white blood cells. IF has also been mistaken for epithelioid sarcoma and elastofibroma dorsi. IF differs from epithelioid sarcoma by its clinical presentation, typical tumor cell morphology, i.e. round cells with atypical nuclei and eosinophilic cytoplasm, and complete or relative lack of necrotic areas. Elastofibroma dorsi is distinguished from IF by its abundant content of elastic fibers.

== Treatment ==
IF tumors are commonly treated by surgical excision although in rare cases these tumors have recurred at the site of their removal. Recurrent tumors have been treated by repeated surgical excisions. Since IF tumors have not been reported to metastasize and no deaths have been attributed to it, long-term clinical observation without surgical intervention is a reasonable alternative to surgery, particularly for IF tumors that are neither uncomfortable, painful, or disfiguring.
