= Eosinophilia–myalgia syndrome =

Rare neurological condition linked to L-tryptophan ingestion

Eosinophilia-myalgia syndrome
- Other names: EMS
- Specialty: Rheumatology

Eosinophilia–myalgia syndrome is a rare, sometimes fatal, neurological condition linked to the ingestion of L-tryptophan. The risk of developing EMS increases with larger doses of tryptophan and increasing age. Some research suggests that certain genetic polymorphisms may be related to the development of EMS. The presence of eosinophilia is a core feature of EMS, along with unusually severe myalgia.

== Signs and symptoms ==
The initial, acute phase of EMS, which last for three to six months, presents as trouble with breathing and muscle problems, including soreness and spasm, but which may also be intense. Muscle weakness is not a feature of this phase, but some people experience muscle stiffness. Additional features can include cough, fever, fatigue, joint pain, edema, and numbness or tingling, usually in the limbs, hands and feet.

The chronic phase follows the acute phase. Eosinophilic fasciitis may develop, primarily in the limbs. Central nervous system signs may appear, including numbness, increased sensation, muscle weakness, and sometimes cardiac or digestive dysfunction. Fatigue is present to some degree, while the muscle pain (which may be extremely intense) and dyspnea continue in this phase.

== Emergence and investigation ==
The first case of eosinophilia–myalgia syndrome was reported to the Centers for Disease Control and Prevention (CDC) in November 1989, although some cases had occurred as early as 2–3 years before this. In total, more than 1,500 cases of EMS were reported to the CDC, as well as at least 37 EMS-associated deaths. After preliminary investigation revealed that the outbreak was linked to intake of tryptophan, the U.S. Food and Drug Administration (FDA) recalled tryptophan supplements in 1989 and banned most public sales in 1990, with other countries following suit.

Subsequent epidemiological studies suggested that EMS was linked to specific batches of L-tryptophan supplied by a single large Japanese manufacturer, Showa Denko. It eventually became clear that recent batches of Showa Denko's L-tryptophan were contaminated by trace impurities, which were subsequently thought to be responsible for the 1989 EMS outbreak. The L-tryptophan was produced by a bacterium grown in open vats in a Showa Denko fertilizer factory. While a total of 63 trace contaminants were eventually identified, only six of them could be associated with EMS. The compound EBT (1,1'-ethylidene-bis-L-tryptophan, also known as "Peak E") was the only contaminant identifiable by initial analysis, but further analysis revealed PAA (3-(phenylamino)-L-alanine, also known as "UV-5"), and peak 200 (2[3-indolyl-methyl]-L-tryptophan). Two of the remaining uncharacterized peaks associated with EMS were later determined to be 3a-hydroxy-1,2,3,3a,8,8a-hexahydropyrrolo-[2,3-b]-indole-2-carboxylic acid (peak C) and 2-(2-hydroxy indoline)-tryptophan (peak FF). These were characterized using accurate mass LC–MS, LC–MS/MS and multistage mass spectrometry (MS^{n}). The last of the six contaminants (peak AAA/"UV-28", being "the contaminant most significantly associated with EMS" has been characterized as two related chain-isomers; peak AAA_{1} ((S)-2-amino-3-(2-((S,E)-7-methylnon-1-en-1-yl)-1H-indol-3-yl)propanoic acid, a condensation product between L-tryptophan and 7-methylnonanoic acid) and peak AAA_{2} ((S)-2-amino-3-(2-((E)-dec-1-en-1-yl)-1H-indol-3-yl)propanoic acid, a condensate between L-tryptophan and decanoic acid). No consistent relationship has ever been firmly established between any specific trace impurity or impurities identified in these batches and the effects of EMS. While EBT in particular has been frequently implicated as the culprit, there is no statistically significant association between EBT levels and EMS. Of the 63 trace contaminants, only the two AAA compounds displayed a statistically significant association with cases of EMS (with a p-value of 0.0014).

As most research has focused on attempts to associate individual contaminants with EMS, there is a comparative lack of detailed research on other possible causal or contributing factors. Tryptophan itself has been implicated as a potentially major contributory factor in EMS. While critics of this theory have argued that this hypothesis fails to explain the near-absent reports of EMS prior to and following the EMS outbreak, this fails to take into account the sudden rapid increase in tryptophan's usage immediately prior to the 1989 outbreak, and ignores the strong influence of the EMS outbreak's legacy and the extended FDA ban on later usage of tryptophan. Crucially, this also ignores the existence of a number of cases of EMS that developed both prior to and after the primary epidemic, including at least one case where the tryptophan was tested and found to lack the contaminants found in the contaminated lots of Showa Denko's tryptophan, as well as cases with other supplements inducing EMS, and even a case of EMS induced by excessive dietary L-tryptophan intake via overconsumption of cashew nuts. A major Canadian analysis located a number of patients that met the CDC criteria for EMS but had never been exposed to tryptophan, which "brings causal interpretations of earlier studies into question". Other studies have highlighted numerous major flaws in many of the epidemiological studies on the association of tryptophan with EMS, which cast serious doubt on the validity of their results. As the FDA concluded, "other brands of L-tryptophan, or L-tryptophan itself, regardless of the levels or presence of impurities, could not be eliminated as causal or contributing to the development of EMS". Even animal studies have suggested that tryptophan itself "when ingested by susceptible individuals either alone or in combination with some other component in the product, results in the pathological features in EMS".

At the time of the outbreak, Showa Denko had recently made alterations to its manufacturing procedures that were thought to be linked to the possible origin of the contaminants detected in the affected lots of tryptophan. A key change was the reduction of the amount of activated charcoal used to purify each batch from >20 kg to 10 kg. A portion of the contaminated batches had also bypassed another filtration step that used reverse-osmosis to remove certain impurities. Additionally, the bacterial culture used to synthesize tryptophan was a strain of Bacillus amyloliquefaciens that had been genetically engineered to increase tryptophan production. Although the prior four generations of the genetically engineered strain had been used without incident, the fifth generation used for the contaminated batches was thought to be a possible source of the impurities that were detected. This has been used to argue that the genetic engineering itself was the primary cause of the contamination, a stance that was heavily criticized for overlooking the other known non-GMO causes of contamination, as well as for its use by anti-GMO activists as a way to threaten the development of biotechnology with false information. The reduction in the amount of activated carbon used and the introduction of the fifth generation Bacillus amyloliquefaciens strain were both associated with the development of EMS, but due to the high overlap of these changes, the precise independent contribution of each change could not be determined (although the bypass of the reverse-osmosis filtration for certain lots was determined to be not significantly associated with the contaminated lots of tryptophan). While Showa Denko claimed a purity of 99.6%, it was noted that "the quantities of the known EMS associated contaminants, EBT and PAA, were remarkably small, of the order of 0.01%, and could easily escape detection".

The FDA restriction on tryptophan sales was loosened in 2001, and fully lifted in 2005. Since the initial ban on L-tryptophan, a normal metabolite of the compound in mammals, 5-hydroxtryptophan (5-HTP) has become a popular replacement dietary supplement.

=== Regulatory response ===
The FDA loosened its restrictions on sales and marketing of tryptophan in February 2001, but continued to limit the importation of tryptophan not intended for an exempted use until 2005.

== Diagnosis ==
There is not a universally accepted diagnostic criteria for EMS. A diagnosis is commonly established when there is swelling, induration, and thickening of the skin and subcutaneous tissue as well as fascial thickening with accumulation of lymphocytes and macrophages with or without eosinophilic infiltration. Minor criteria also includes eosinophilia > 0.5 × 109/L, hypergammaglobulinemia > 1.5 g/L, muscle weakness, elevated aldolase levels, Groove sign and/or peau d/orange, and hyperintense fascia on MR T2-weighted images. MRI is considered the best imaging modality to show increased signal intensity within the fascia. Alternatives are positron emission tomography/computed tomography (PET-CT) for diagnosis and ultrasonography for clinical follow-up.

== Treatment ==
Treatment is withdrawal of products containing L-tryptophan and the administration of glucocorticoids. Most patients recover fully, remain stable, or show slow recovery, but the disease is fatal in up to 5% of patients.

== See also ==
- Toxic oil syndrome
