= Wheelchair cushion =

Wheelchair cushions are cushions specifically designed to provide comfort and protection against injury for wheelchair users. They also aid in properly positioning the user in the correct posture.

Wheelchair users are at great risk for pressure sores. A number of factors are included in the formation of these ulcers including:

1. Insufficient vascularization in areas of high pressure, typically under bony prominences.
2. The collection of sweat on the skin due to inadequate air flow.
3. The presence of local areas of elevated temperature.
4. Shear stresses on the skin.

A number of studies point to interface pressure between the body and the seating surface as the primary contributor to the formation of pressure sores. In response, manufacturers have developed a number of wheelchair seat cushion alternatives. Over 200 models of wheelchair cushions were on the market as of 2001.

== Characteristics ==
Various characteristics, combined with a number of cover material options, offer a myriad of possibilities, which can be manipulated to provide various performance properties. These properties are intended to provide the wheelchair user optimal comfort, stability, and postural support, as well as aid in the prevention of pressure ulcers.

The effectiveness of a particular choice of material and design has high variance with respect to a user's medical needs and activities. For instance, if a wheelchair user frequently moves on rough surfaces, gel cushions are less optimal as they are not as effective at absorbing impact.

Sprigle et al. proposed the following criteria for defining and describing cushion characteristics:

Material and construction

- Cushions using cellular materials – foam (convoluted, segmented), flexible matrix, viscoelastic foam or matrix, nondeforming foam or matrix
- Cushions containing fluid – viscoelastic fluid, air cushion, water cushion
- Other construction – solid elastomer and solid gel, cushion with displacing solid elements

Physical characteristics

- Surface characteristics – unloaded contour depth, loaded contour depth, contour, cut-out, segmented, convoluted foam
- Features – preischial support, lateral pelvic support, medial thigh support, lateral thigh support
- Other – bonded, compartment or chamber, stiffness, flat or curved base

== Design examples ==
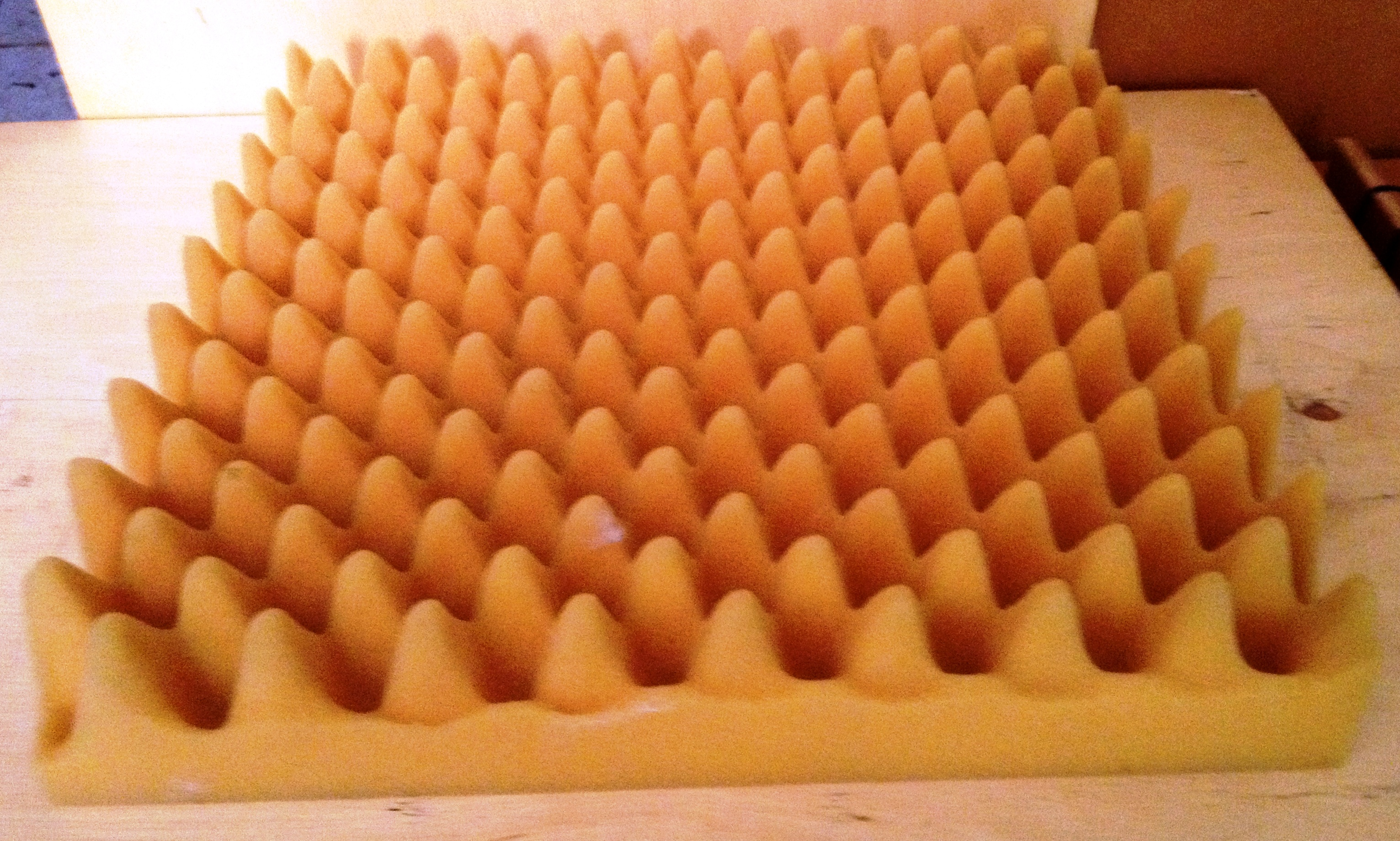
Convoluted foam cushion

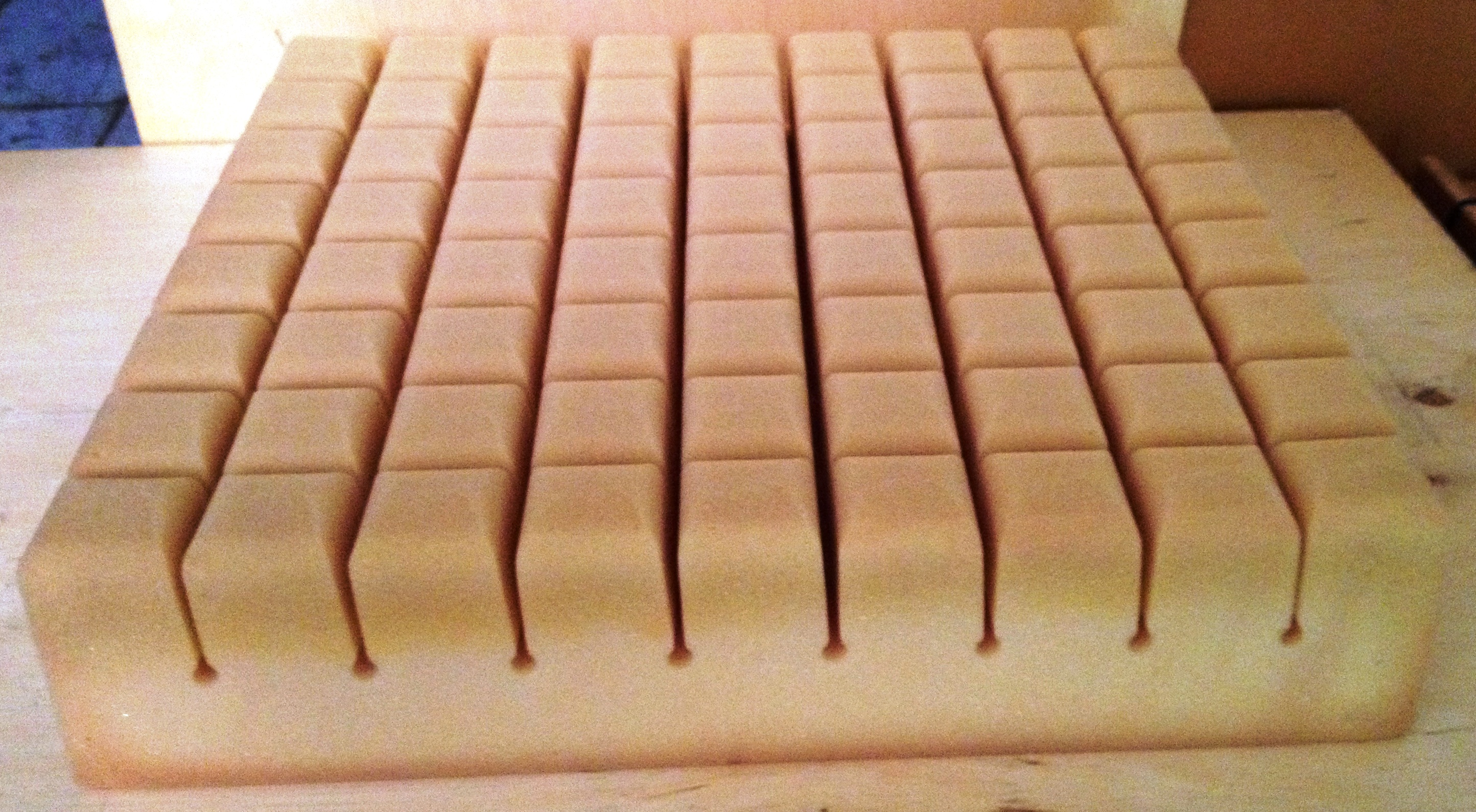
Segmented foam cushion

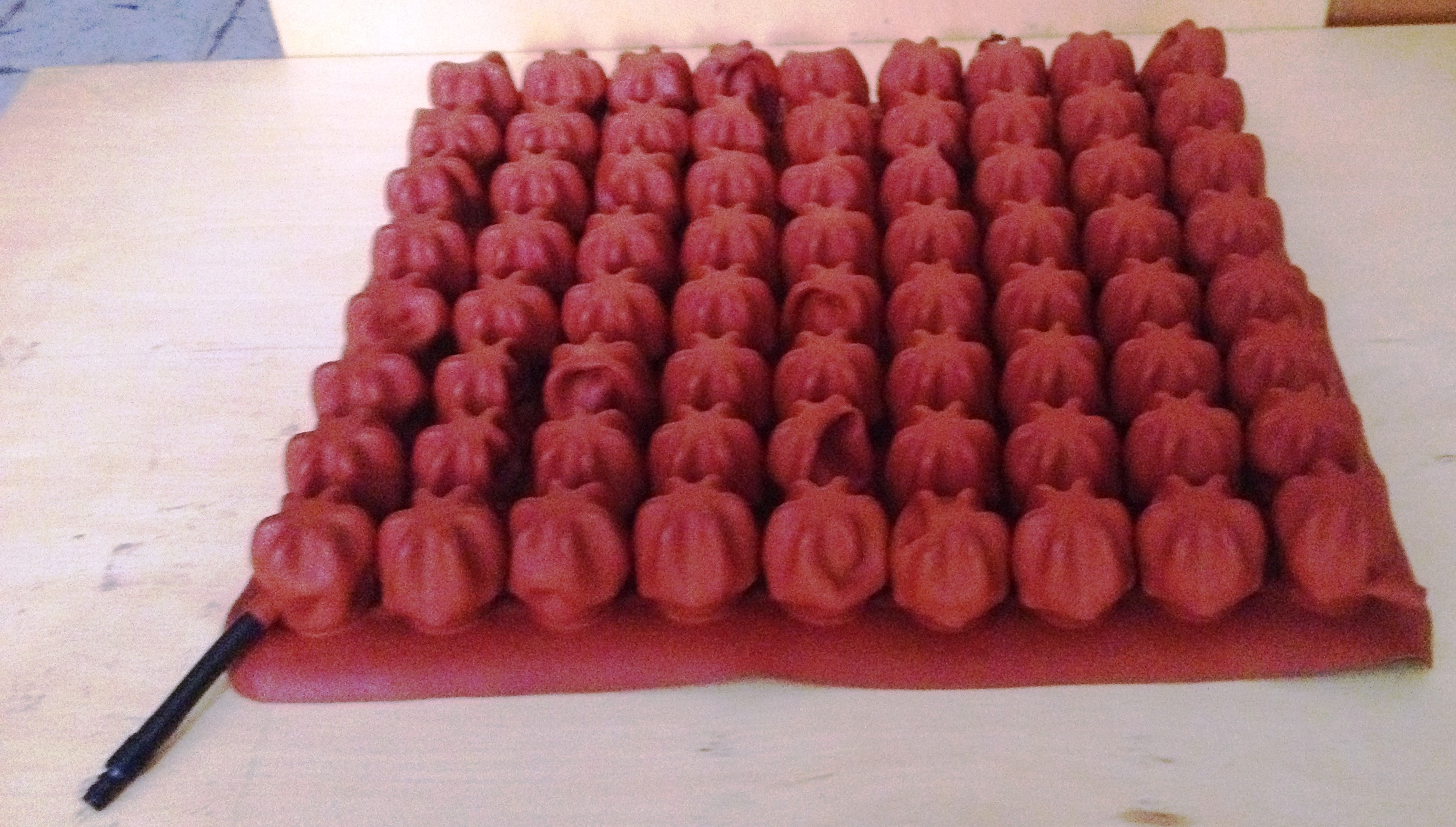
Low profile segmented air cushion

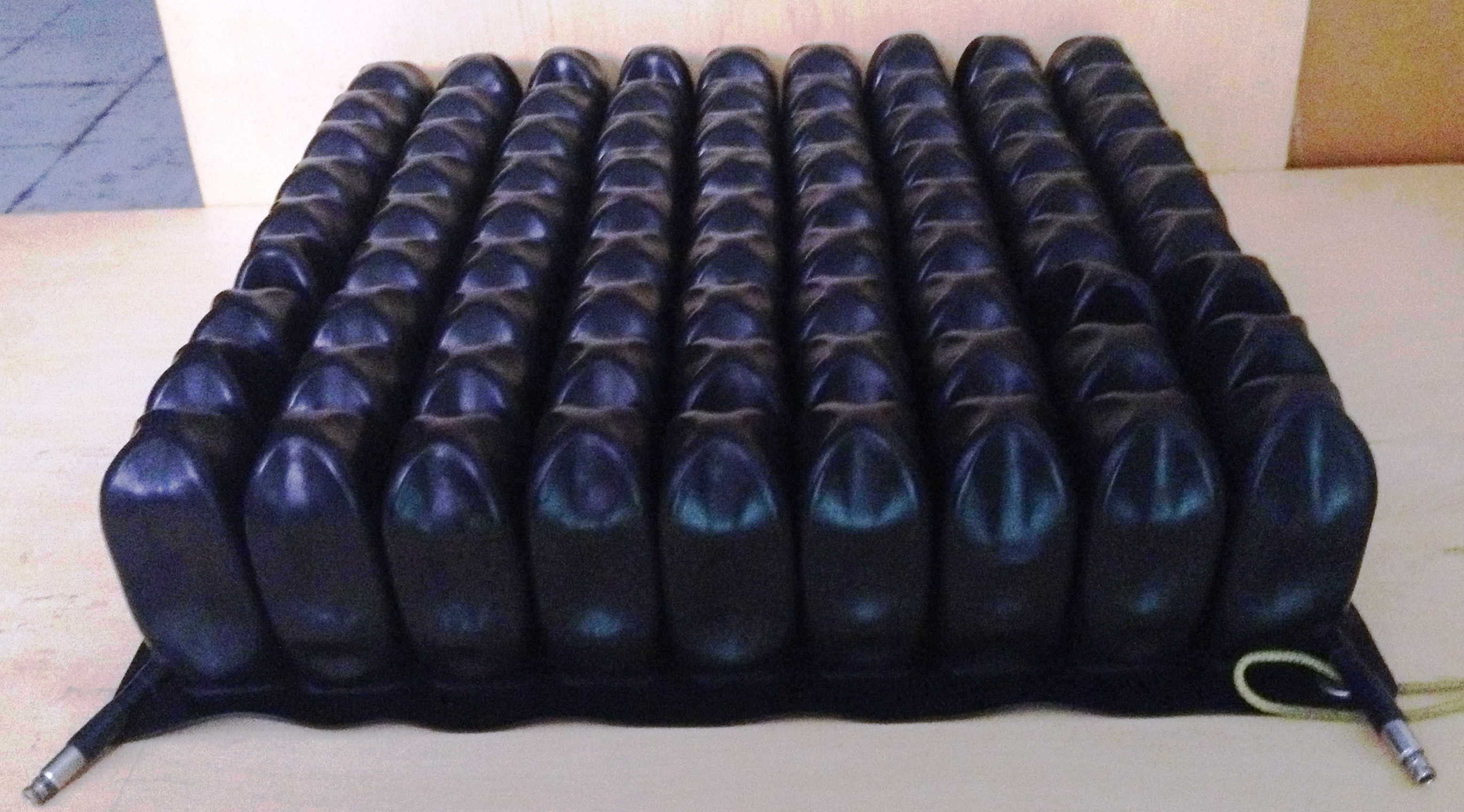
High profile segmented air cushion

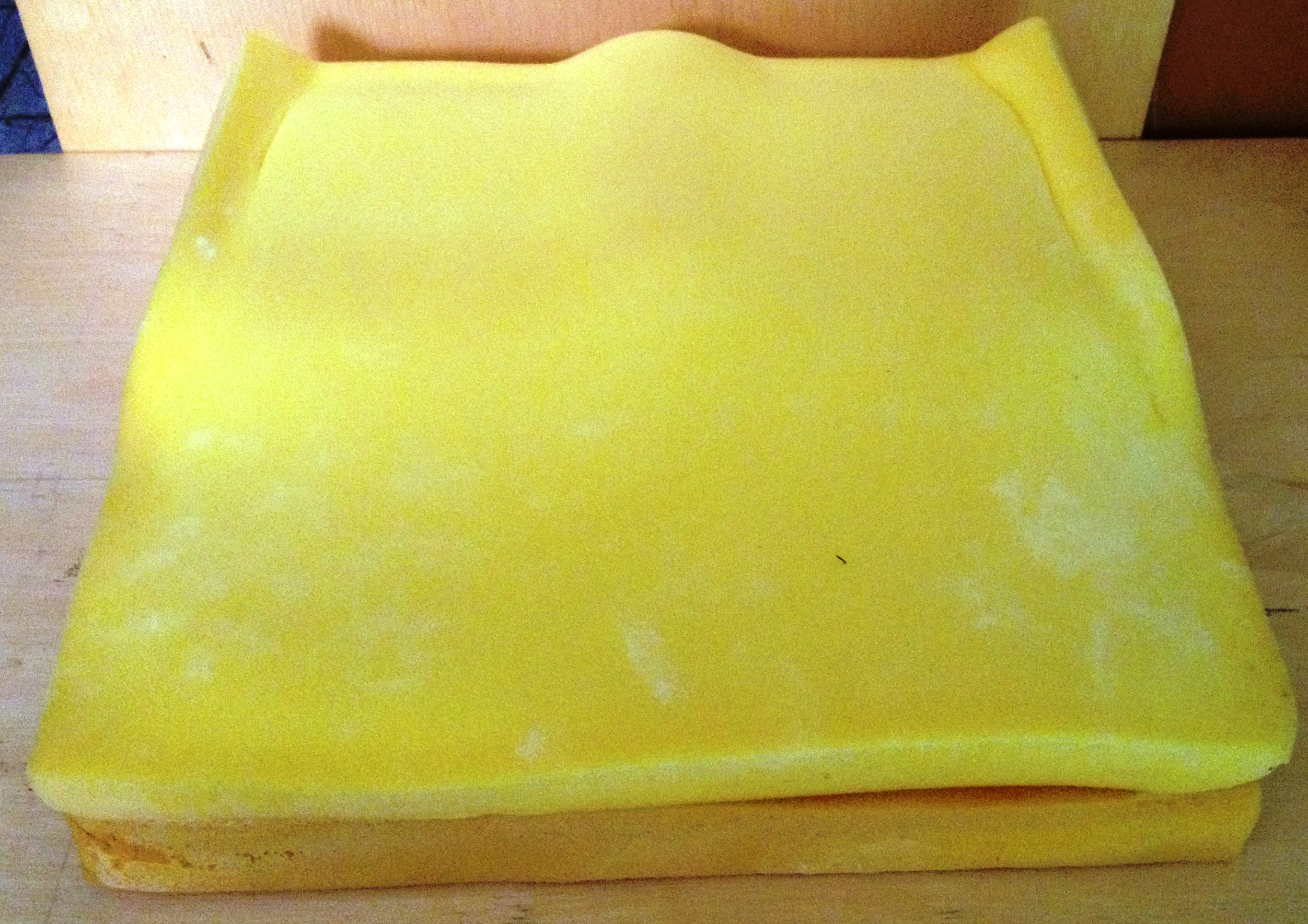
Foam and viscoelastic foam cushion

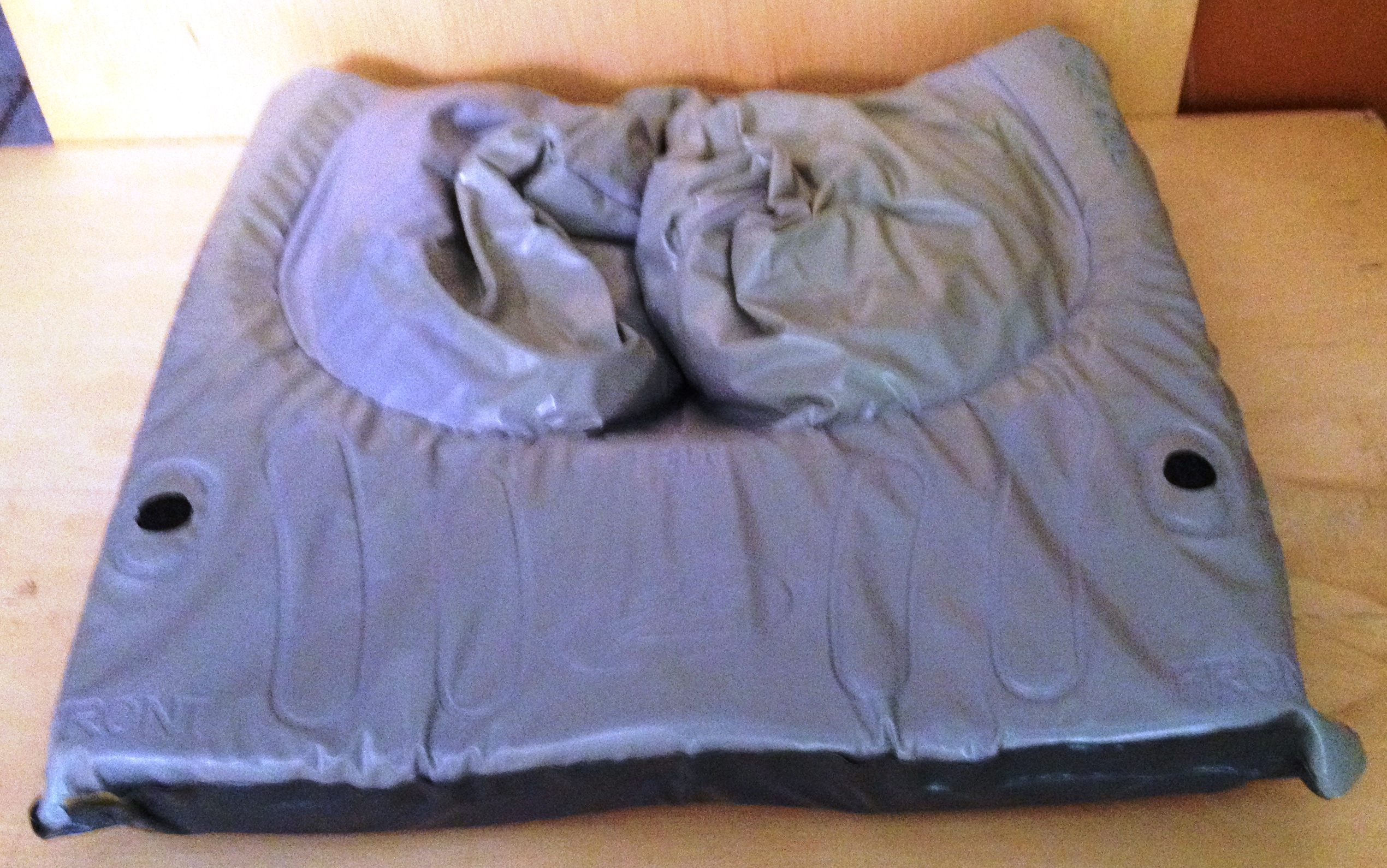
Foam and viscous fluid cushion

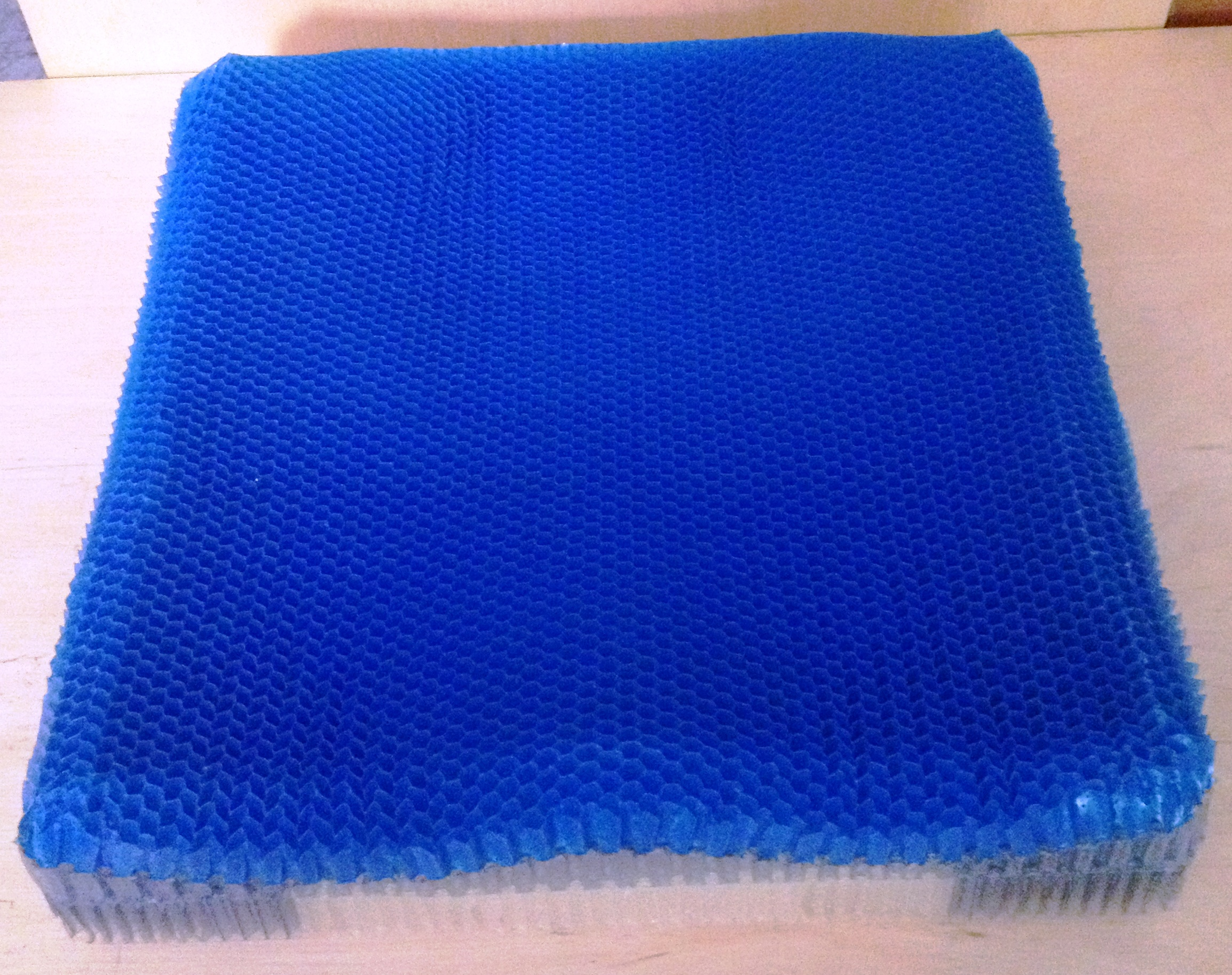
Honeycomb cushion
