= Perianal cellulitis =

- Other names: Perianitis, Perianal streptococcal dermatitis, Perianal dermatitis, Streptococcal anitis, Streptococcal perianitis
- Specialty: Dermatology
- Symptoms: Redness, swelling, itching, pain
- Duration: Treatment ranges from 14 to 21 days
- Causes: Group A Streptococci (Streptococcus pyogenes) (most common) Staphylococcus aureus Group B Streptococci (Streptococcus agalactiae)
- Diagnostic method: Bacterial culture
- Differential diagnosis: Candidiasis, irritant diaper dermatitis, pinworm infestation, chronic inflammatory bowel disease, seborrheic dermatitis, or even sexual abuse.

Perianal cellulitis, also known as perianitis or perianal streptococcal dermatitis, is a bacterial infection affecting the lower layers of the skin (cellulitis) around the anus. It presents as bright redness in the skin and can be accompanied by pain, difficulty defecating, itching, and bleeding. This disease is considered a complicated skin and soft tissue infection (cSSTI) because of the involvement of the deeper soft tissues.

Perianal cellulitis is most commonly caused by group A beta-hemolytic streptococcus bacteria (Streptococcus pyogenes), which resides normally ("in small numbers") in the human throat and on the human skin. Other less common causes may include infection with group B beta-hemolytic streptococci (Streptococcus agalactiae), a bacterium found in the human vagina of some, or Staphylococcus aureus, a common component of the bacterial community in the human nose and/or skin.

Perianal cellulitis occurs mainly in male children between six months and 10 years of age, however, there are documented cases of perianal cellulitis in adults as well. Oral antibiotics are the first line treatment for perianal cellulitis and may be used in combination with topical antibiotics. Since the infection occurs within the deeper layers of skin, using a topical treatment by itself may not be effective. In about 20% of cases, recurrence of perianal streptococcal dermatitis infection occurs within 3.5 months. Routine hygiene practices should also be encouraged in children and adults in order to reduce the risk of recurrent infection.

== Signs and symptoms ==
Perianal cellulitis manifests as multiple symptoms that are inconsistent with a systemic disease. The most notable feature is a very distinct redness around the anus, and other signs of inflammation which can include swelling and itching at the site. Other associated symptoms with perianal cellulitis include pain when defecating and bleeding. These symptoms can often be confused with other skin conditions, such as diaper rash, eczema, psoriasis, hemorrhoids, and more. These symptoms can cause extreme discomfort, especially in diaper-wearing infants, and serious complications can arise if left untreated. In about 10% of cases, balanitis or vulvovaginitis can develop concomitantly. In even rarer instances, tonsillopharyngitis can develop concomitantly as well.

Complications most often occur when perianal cellulitis remains undiagnosed and untreated for an extended period of time. In cases where perianal cellulitis is left untreated, it can cause more serious symptoms such as abscess formation and rheumatic fever. Additionally, untreated perianal cellulitis poses a risk of transmission to other people, such as caretakers or family members. Perianal cellulitis can also cause post-streptococcal nephritis, which should be monitored with urinalysis to assess kidney function.

== Diagnosis ==
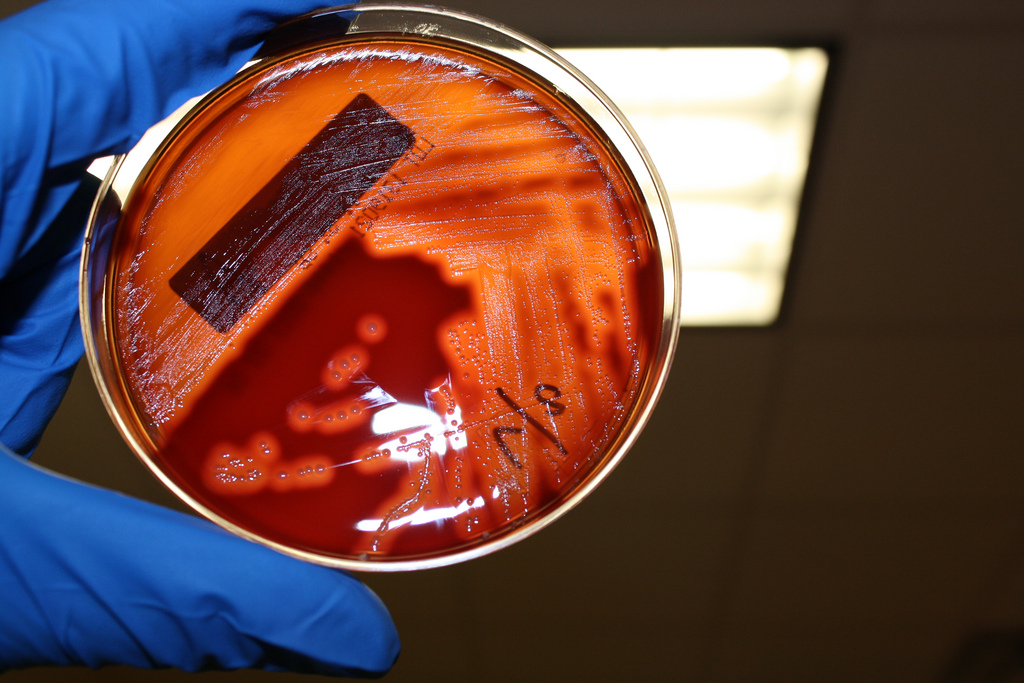
Bacterial culture growth of Streptococcus pyogenes

The diagnosis of perianal cellulitis is made either through a rapid strep test or by swabbing the affected areas for a bacterial culture indicating infection by group A β-hemolytic streptococci. In order to confirm diagnosis of perianal streptococcal dermatitis, the anus and genitalia require examination followed by bacterial swabbing of the exudate from the affected area is preferred. The swabs will be sent for microbiological analysis of the culture to confirm the growth of group A β-hemolytic streptococci. "The time to diagnosis of perianal streptococcal dermatitis is ≥3 weeks in 65% of cases." Because perianal cellulitis is commonly misdiagnosed, it is imperative that the proper diagnosing procedures are followed when encountering these symptoms, as delayed detection can result in severe complications.

Within the pediatric population, it is common for the management of rashes to occur under the collaboration of an inter-professional team. Due to the diverse causes of rashes in the pediatric population, it may be necessary to refer pediatric patients to a pediatrician or a dermatologist to prevent misdiagnosis of perianal streptococcal dermatitis. Across the different disciplines of care, nurses have an opportunity to provide education on proper hygiene techniques to reduce the risk of recurrent infection. Pharmacists can provide patient and caretaker counseling on the selected medication therapy and improve medication adherence. By working together as an inter-professional team, all types of clinicians can improve patient health outcomes by raising awareness and reducing both time to diagnosis and the rate of recurrence of perianal streptococcal dermatitis infection.

=== Differential diagnosis ===
Due to the non-specific presentation of the symptoms of perianal streptococcal dermatitis, it is frequently misdiagnosed by clinicians. To reach the correct diagnosis of perianal streptococcal dermatitis often ranges from weeks to months and can extend to even longer. During this time, the patient can undergo treatment for a variety of differential diagnoses. Perianal streptococcal dermatitis imitates other common diseases in the anal region and therefore can be mistaken for "candidiasis, irritant diaper dermatitis, pinworm infestation, chronic inflammatory bowel disease, seborrheic dermatitis, or even sexual abuse." The delay in diagnosis of perianal streptococcal dermatitis can result in prolonged discomfort and additional symptoms of constipation, anal discharge or oozing, and anal fissures.

== Pathophysiology ==
=== Causes ===
In most cases of perianal streptococcal dermatitis in children, swab cultures indicate that infection is caused by the bacteria Streptococcus pyogenes, more specifically classified as group A beta-hemolytic streptococci (GAS). There have been reported cases, however, that have found perianal streptococcal cellulitis infections to be caused by group B beta-hemolytic streptococci (GBS) and, in rare cases, other groups of beta-hemolytic streptococci or Staphylococcus aureus. In the rare adult cases of perianal streptococcal cellulitis that have been identified, the most common cause is by beta-hemolytic streptococci from group B specified as Streptococcus agalactiae.

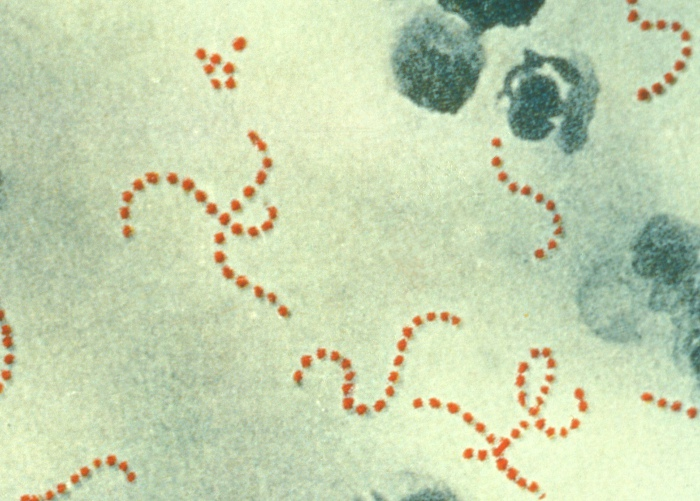
Streptococcus pyogenes under 900x magnification, viewed with Pappenheim's stain

Streptococci are gram-positive bacteria that grow in chains, but they have no motility and do not generate spores. Group A streptococci and Group B streptococci are the two most common strains that are associated with pediatric cases. Infections caused by Group A streptococci are generally more mild than infections caused by Group B streptococci. The most common Group A streptococcus infections can range from strep throat to pneumonia to cellulitis. Group B streptococcus is more commonly found in the gastrointestinal and genital tracts, and can also be transmitted vertically from mother to child during vaginal labor. These newborn cases of infection often manifest as sepsis, pneumonia, and meningitis, among other presentations.

Based on cases studied of children with perianal streptococcal dermatitis, there has been a pattern of perianal infection occurring after being diagnosed with previous streptococcal infections (i.e. "strep throat"). It is believed that bacteria from these infections may be introduced to the skin of the perianal region after touching the nose or mouth and then proceeding to use the toilet or touching the area for any other reason.

While perianal streptococcal dermatitis is a treatable condition, there are serious consequences that may arise if left undiagnosed and/or untreated in patients with an infection. Failure to properly diagnose and treat perianal streptococcal dermatitis may lead to more serious infections that could result in injury or death.

=== Mechanism ===
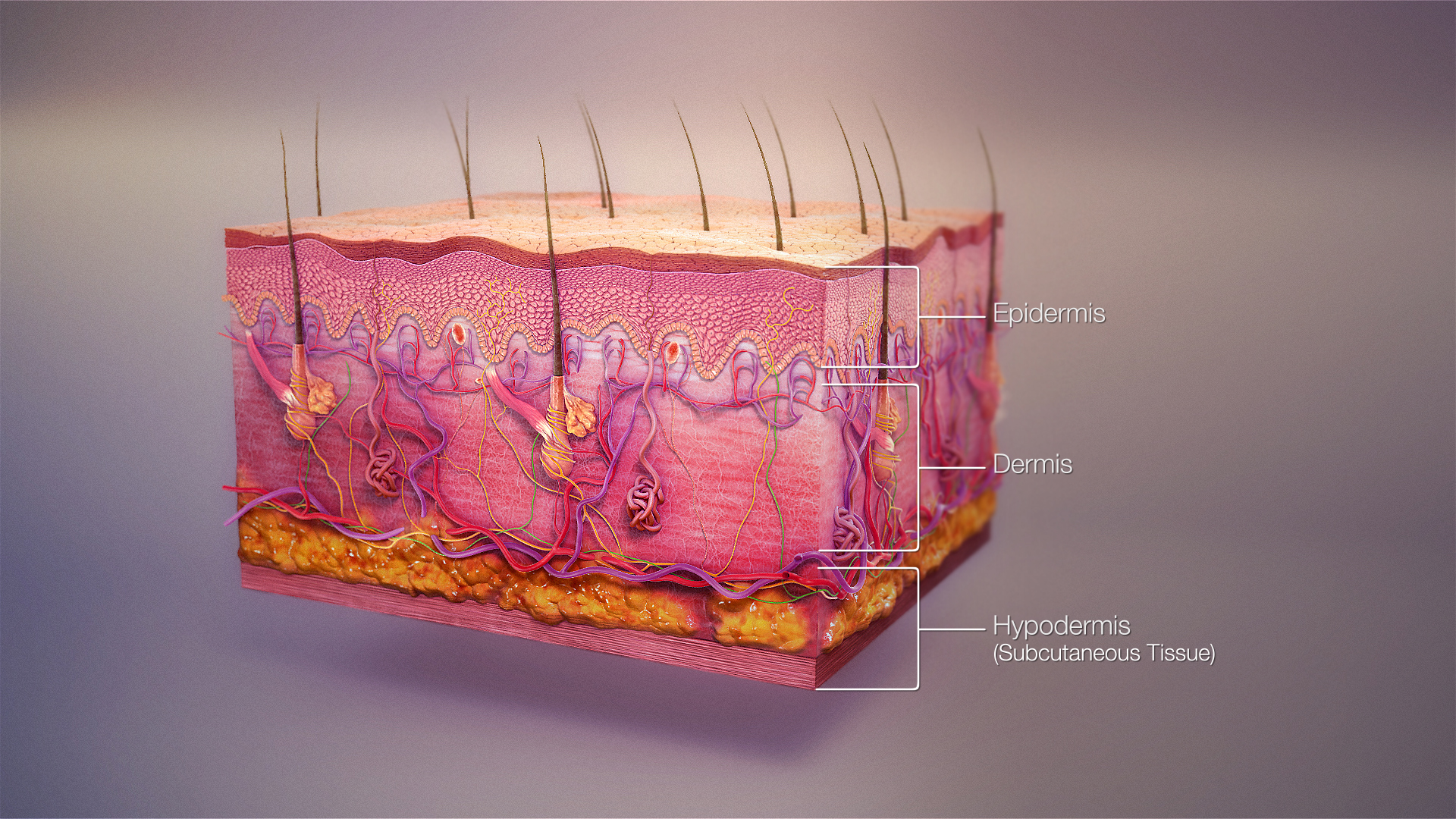
Layers of normal human skin. Cellulitis indicates infection in the dermis and/or subcutaneous (fat) layer.

Upon the initial exposure of Streptococcus pyogenes (group A beta-hemolytic streptocci) bacteria to the skin surrounding the perianal region, the bacteria adheres to the skin's surface with filaments on its cell wall surface called adhesins. An adhesin found in group A beta-hemolytic streptococci of particular importance is called the M protein, which utilizes complex mechanisms to recognize various receptors on human cell types for attachment. After attachment, colonization of Streptococcus pyogenes occurs and the bacteria release many toxins that are responsible for the manifestation of symptoms of perianal cellulitis such as inflammation, fever, and itching. Secretion of hyaluronidase, also known as "spreading factor", encourages the Streptococcus pyogenes bacterium to spread more easily throughout the lower layers of skin tissue (subcutaneous tissue). As the streptococci continue to colonize, the formation of a biofilm may arise and its protective properties may make it more difficult to treat the infection with antibiotics.

In cases of perianal cellulitis infections that are not treated properly, group A beta-hemolytic streptococci may cross into the bloodstream through the epithelium of the perianal area to cause serious infections such as necrotizing fasciitis or toxic shock syndrome. The group A beta-hemolytic streptococci bacteria that enter the bloodstream are able to cause serious infections by overpowering natural immune responses and allowing bacteria to rapidly multiply to cause harm to the body.

== Treatment ==
After the diagnosis of perianal streptococcal dermatitis has been confirmed, the most successful treatment regimens utilize a combination of topical and systemic antibiotics. Oral antibiotics are the recommended first-line treatment for perianal streptococcal dermatitis. Perianal streptococcal dermatitis does not resolve on its own. The treatment of choice for oral antibiotics include "penicillin V, azithromycin, clarithromycin, clindamycin, erythromycin, penicillinase-resistant penicillin, or cephalosporins." Oral antibiotics work best in combination with a topical antibiotic such as mupirocin, or an antiseptic such as chlorhexidine. Due to the effect that perianal streptococcal dermatitis has on the deeper layers of the skin, topical antimicrobial therapy alone appears to be poorly effective. Treatment duration ranges from 14 to 21 days and treatment success is determined by clinical examination and post-treatment swabbing of the affected area to confirm that the infection is no longer present.

== Prevention & Recurrence ==
There is little data that currently exists on the prevention of perianal cellulitis. However, "approximately one-third of people with cellulitis suffer recurrent episodes and the only proven strategy for preventing this is long-term, low-dose oral penicillin." Performing post-treatment swabbing and confirming eradication of group A β-hemolytic streptococci infection reduces the chance of perianal streptococcal dermatitis recurrence. In about 20% of cases, recurrence of perianal streptococcal dermatitis infection occurs within 3.5 months. In the case of perianal cellulitis, maintaining the dryness of the site and addressing the infection with topical antifungal ointment is sufficient to prevent recurrent infection for a duration between 3 and 6 weeks. Potential risk factors for perianal streptococcal dermatitis include: poor living conditions, atopic dermatitis, and malnutrition. Routine hygiene practices should also be encouraged in children and adults in order to reduce the risk of recurrent infection. Prescribed antibiotic regimens should also be adhered to until completion, so as to avoid the risk of developing a multi-resistant strain of infection in the future.

Proper screening measures should be followed as perianal cellulitis continues to be severely underdiagnosed. Perianal cellulitis is often misdiagnosed as other skin conditions, such as diaper rash (in infants), eczema, psoriasis, hemorrhoids, and more.

== Epidemiology ==
The incidence of perianal streptococcal dermatitis in the pediatric population has not been determined. It is believed that the lack of data is due to the difficulty clinicians face recognizing perianal streptococcal dermatitis. Perianal streptococcal dermatitis most commonly affects children between 6 months and 10 years old, with males being more commonly affected than females. Results from a systematic literature review further supports this as a majority of childhood cases of perianal streptococcal cellulitis occurred in males younger than 7 years old.

While traditionally thought to be a disease specific to children, there have been case reports of perianal streptococcal dermatitis in adults.

== Etymology ==
The term perianal is made up of two components, peri- (Greek prefix meaning "about" or "around") and anal ("related to, or involving the anus"). Cellulitis describes a bacterial infection affecting the lower layers of the skin.

Historically, perianal cellulitis may be referred to as perianal streptococcal dermatitis. However, perianal cellulitis is best understood to be a cellulitis, an infection of the inner layers of skin, rather than a dermatitis, which implies an irritation of the outermost layers of skin (the epidermis).

== See also ==
- List of cutaneous conditions
- CDC List of Group A Streptococcal Diseases
