= Eosinophilic fasciitis =

- Other names: Shulman syndrome
- Specialty: Rheumatology

Eosinophilic fasciitis (/ˌiːəˌsɪnəˈfɪlɪk ˌfæʃiˈaɪtɪs, ˌiːoʊ-, -ˌfæsi-/ (Note: "Eosinophilic". Lexico UK English Dictionary. Oxford University Press. Archived from the original on 2020-03-22. "fasciitis". Oxford Dictionaries UK English Dictionary. Oxford University Press.)), also known as Shulman's syndrome or diffuse fasciitis with eosinophilia, is an inflammatory disease that affects the fascia, other connective tissues, surrounding muscles, blood vessels and nerves. Unlike other forms of fasciitis, eosinophilic fasciitis is typically self-limited and confined to the arms and legs, although it can require treatment with corticosteroids, and some cases are associated with aplastic anemia.

The condition was first characterized by Shulman in 1974, but it is not yet known whether it is actually a distinct condition or merely a variant presentation of another syndrome. The presentation is similar to that of scleroderma or systemic sclerosis. However, unlike scleroderma, eosinophilic fasciitis affects the deeper fascial layers, rather than the dermis; the characteristic and severe effects of scleroderma and systemic sclerosis, such as Raynaud's syndrome, involvement of the extremities, prominent small blood vessels (telangiectasias), and visceral changes such as swallowing problems, are absent. Nevertheless, the term remains used for diagnostic purposes.

== Epidemiology ==
This is a very rare disease with only about 100 cases reported. The typical age of onset is around 20 to 60 years of age, although cases in children have been observed. Its prevalence is slight more common in men compared to women with a 1.5:1 ratio, although more studies still need to be done.

== Causes ==
Most cases are idiopathic, however some have been associated with:

- strenuous exercise,
- initiation of hemodialysis,
- infection with Borrelia burgdorferi,
- certain medications, such as statins, phenytoin, ramipril, and subcutaneous heparin
- other autoimmune diseases, such as systemic sclerosis, systemic lupus erythematosus, and Sjogren syndrome
- hematologic disorders such as aplastic anemia, multiple myeloma, chronic lymphocytic leukemia, other leukemias and lymphomas

== Signs and symptoms ==
Because the disease is rare and clinical presentations vary, a clear set of symptoms is difficult to define. The main symptoms are pain and swelling to the distal extremities. Initial presentation usually involves symmetrical swelling and thickening of the skin to the forearms and lower legs, with associated pain and erythema. The hands and feet are typically spared. As the disease progresses, the skin texture starts puckering and gives an "orange peel" appearance. Systemic symptoms such as fever and generalized fatigue can also present. Other common features include fibrosis of the skin, joint pain, and secondary carpal tunnel syndrome due to compression of the median nerve.

== Diagnosis ==
Since this condition has many similarities with other autoimmune diseases, the first step is to exclude other conditions such as systemic sclerosis. The key to diagnosis is the observation of skin changes in combination with eosinophilia, but the most accurate test is a biopsy of skin, fascia, and muscle.

=== Major criterion ===
- symmetrical "plate-like" sclerotic lesions in the distal extremities (with no signs of Raynaud phenomenon and exclusion of systemic sclerosis)

=== Minor criteria ===
- histology of a skin biopsy shows fibrosis of the subcutaneous connective tissue, with thickening of the fascia and eosinophilic infiltration
- Imaging tests such as magnetic resonance imaging (MRI) shows thickening of the fascia

Definitive diagnosis is made if the patient meets the major criterion and at least 1 of the 2 minor criteria.

== Treatment ==
First-line treatment include oral corticosteroid therapy. Most patients have a favorable course as the dose is tapered gradually in 1–2 years. Second-line include therapy include disease-modifying anti-rheumatic drug (DMARD) such as hydroxychloroquine, methotrexate, cyclosporine, cyclophosphamide. Patients usually have good prognosis with early initiation of treatment if there is no visceral involvement.

== See also ==
- Eosinophilia
- List of cutaneous conditions
