= Virtual colony count =

Virtual colony count (VCC) is a kinetic, 96-well microbiological assay originally developed to measure the activity of defensins. It has since been applied to other antimicrobial peptides including LL-37. It utilizes a method of enumerating bacteria called quantitative growth kinetics, which compares the time taken for a bacterial batch culture to reach a threshold optical density with that of a series of calibration curves. The name VCC has also been used to describe the application of quantitative growth kinetics to enumerate bacteria in cell culture infection models. Antimicrobial susceptibility testing (AST) can be done on 96-well plates by diluting the antimicrobial agent at varying concentrations in broth inoculated with bacteria and measuring the minimum inhibitory concentration that results in no growth. However, these methods cannot be used to study some membrane-active antimicrobial peptides, which are inhibited by the broth itself. The virtual colony count procedure takes advantage of this fact by first exposing bacterial cells to the active antimicrobial agent in a low-salt buffer for two hours, then simultaneously inhibiting antimicrobial activity and inducing exponential growth by adding broth. The growth kinetics of surviving cells can then be monitored using a temperature-controlled plate reader. The time taken for each growth curve to reach a threshold change in optical density is then converted into virtual survival values, which serve as a measure of antimicrobial activity.

== Antimicrobial susceptibility testing ==
Methods have existed for testing the antibacterial activity of antimicrobial agents for many decades. Typically, these involve exposing bacteria to the antimicrobial agent in the presence of nutrients that would otherwise allow robust growth of the bacteria. Experiments could either be conducted on plates containing agar as a solid support, or in liquid broth without agar. Many small molecule antibiotics were developed using these methods. However, a complication arose when researchers wished to study the antibacterial activity of some antimicrobial peptides, because they are inhibited by rich media, whether supplied on an agar plate or in broth. For example, defensins are antimicrobial peptides that are part of the innate immune system of many organisms including humans. They are divided into several structural classes including alpha, beta, and theta, based on the pattern of disulfide bonding. Four human alpha defensins are found in the granules of the neutrophil, and these are known as human neutrophil peptides (HNP) 1-4. Very early in the study of defensins, it was discovered that HNPs are strongly inhibited by physiological salt concentrations. In order to measure the antimicrobial activity of HNPs, they had to be incubated with cells in a low salt buffer as a separate initial step, before rich media was added allowing the enumeration of survivors. Since there is no way to assay peptides such as the defensin HNP1 in the presence of physiologically relevant salt concentrations, any assay that measures HNP1 activity uses conditions that are different from those present in the body.

== Traditional colony count ==
One method commonly employed to measure antimicrobial activity in liquid is to expose the antimicrobial agent to cells during an incubation time such as two hours, and then enumerate survivors by diluting the mixture and then spreading a portion of the liquid on an agar plate containing rich media. The incubation step is commonly done on a 96-well plate. After spreading, the agar plates are then incubated overnight and the number of colony forming units (CFU) is counted the next day. These methods have a number of drawbacks including inaccuracy introduced in the dilution step and the possibility that a large number of agar plates would be required in order to produce an acceptable number of colonies per plate. Note that in order to measure the antimicrobial activity of antimicrobial agents such as defensins, the two hour incubation step would be conducted in a low-salt buffer such as 10 mM sodium phosphate pH 7.4.

== Minimum inhibitory concentration ==
Another method commonly employed to measure antimicrobial activity in liquid is to expose dilution series of the antimicrobial agent to cells in rich broth such as Mueller-Hinton broth (MHB) in a 96-well plate, and then incubate the 96-well plate at 37 °C overnight. Each well will either become turbid with bacterial growth or remain clear. The minimum inhibitory concentration (MIC) is then reported as the lowest concentration that produces a clear well and thus inhibits growth. Standardized MIC methods using MHB are not applicable to antimicrobial agents such as defensins, because defensins must be incubated in a low salt buffer, not rich broth, in order to measure their activity.

== Virtual colony count ==
The traditional colony count method could be modified to measure antimicrobial activity in the 96-well plate without the need for sampling the wells and spreading surviving cells on agar plates by simply adding an equal volume of twice-concentrated broth after the two hour incubation in the low salt buffer. There would need to be a way to determine how many cells survived at the end of the incubation period using batch cultures. Fortunately, the mathematics of exponential growth offers a way to do just that. If the turbidity, or optical density, of the batch cultures within the 96-well plate is monitored in real time, and the amount of time required for a well to reach a threshold is recorded, and the doubling time of the exponentially growing cells is known, then the number of cells originally present in the inoculum can be calculated. This starting number of cells is equal to the number of surviving cells at the end of the two hour incubation with the antimicrobial agent. Because this procedure requires no actual colony formation or colony counting, it is termed "virtual colony count". Thus far the VCC technique has been limited to antimicrobial peptides. It could potentially work with other antimicrobial agents, as long as the twice-concentrated Mueller Hinton Broth inactivates the antimicrobial activity of the agent. The VCC method can detect either bactericidal or bacteriostatic activity, but it cannot distinguish between them. However, bacteriostatic activity can be quantified by measuring the difference in threshold times between the "input" and "output" controls (see below).

== General laboratory procedure for use in VCC assays ==
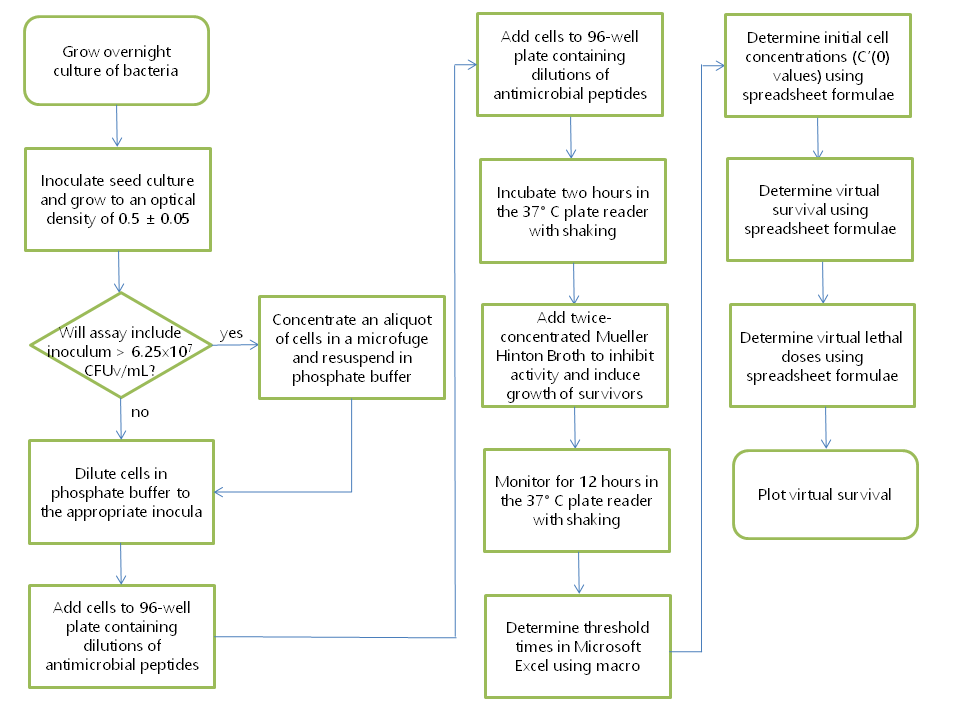
Virtual colony count procedure

A 2 mL bacterial culture is inoculated from a single colony and grown overnight in Phosphate Mueller Hinton (PMH) or Phosphate Mueller Hinton Tryptic Soy Broth (PMHT) media. PMH is a 1:1 mixture of Mueller Hinton Broth and 10 mM sodium phosphate pH 7.4. Either cation-adjusted or non-cation-adjusted MHB may be used. In some experiments, 1% Tryptic Soy Broth (TSB) was present in the phosphate buffer to enhance defensin activity during the two hour incubation; in this case the analogous 1:1 mixture of buffer and broth contained 0.5% TSB and is called PMHT. 250 μl of this culture is transferred to 25 mL of PMH in a 125 mL disposable filter flask. This culture is grown at 37 °C shaking 250 rpm typically 2–3 hours until the optical density of the culture at 650 nm is between 0.45 and 0.55. Meanwhile, antimicrobial peptides are diluted on a 96-well plate (Costar 3595, which are tissue culture-treated) in 10 mM sodium phosphate pH 7.4 such that the final volume is 90 microliters. Virtual colony forming units, or CFUv, is defined in the original VCC publication and its definition is repeated here: CFUv was held constant among the six strains tested so that the turbidity, and thus the amount of cell membrane, in each experiment was roughly equal. Because CFUv was standardized to the CFU of Escherichia coli ATCC 25922, CFU, not CFUv, can be reported with this strain. For the experimental portion of the assay, cells are diluted in 10 mM sodium phosphate pH 7.4 such that the final cell concentration in 10 microliters is 5 million CFUv/mL. 10 μl of this cell suspension are pipetted beneath the 90 μl of antimicrobial peptides in solution, resulting in a cell suspension at the standard inoculum of 5 × 10^{5} CFUv/mL during the exposure of cells to antimicrobial peptides. Several wells of the 96-well plate are used for controls exposed to no antimicrobial agent; these are termed the "output" controls. The 96-well plate was then incubated two hours in the plate reader, set to shake and take readings every five minutes. During this incubation time, the seed culture was kept on ice. For a calibration curve, 1 mL of seed culture was added to 1.5 mL of PMH after the two hour incubation to generate a suspension of 10^{8} CFUv/mL. A 10-fold dilution series of this suspension was made ranging from 10^{7} to 10^{0} CFUv/ml in 200 μl total volume of PMH, occupying eight wells of the 96-well plate. At this time, cells exposed to no antimicrobial agent were added to several wells of the plate from the culture kept on ice; these are termed the "input" controls, since they indicate the number of cells present at the start of the two hour incubation. In the initially published VCC experiments only the internal 60 wells of the plate were used, since evaporation changed the volume of the edge wells during the 12-hour incubation. However, all 96 wells of the 96-well plate can be used for the experiment as long as the edge of the plate is wrapped with a piece of Parafilm M six squares long by one half square wide. The gas-permeable Parafilm retards evaporation while allowing cellular respiration and preventing particulate matter from being blown into the 96-well plate in the plate reader. Once the plate is wrapped with Parafilm, it is transferred from the biosafety cabinet to the plate reader. Several models of temperature-controlled plate readers have successfully been used in VCC assays, including a Molecular Devices Vmax kept in a warm room, a Molecular Devices Spectramax, and a Tecan Infinite M1000. The plate reader is set to read optical density at 650 nm every 5 minutes for 12 hours, shaking before each reading. Raw data is imported into Microsoft Excel, where the macro VCC Calculate is run to determine the time required for each growth curve to reach a threshold optical density of 0.02.

== Quantitative growth kinetics ==
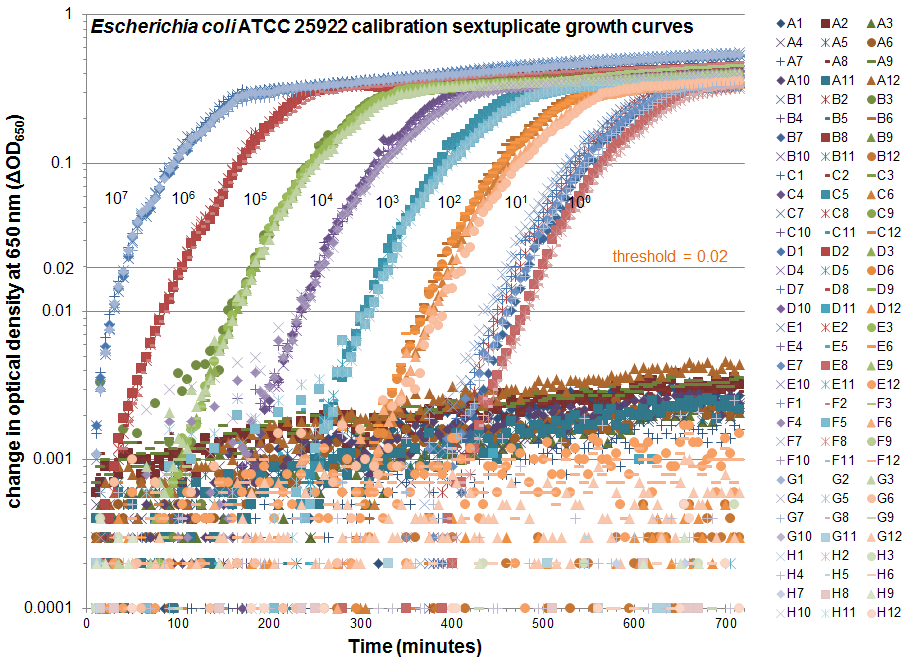
VCC calibration curves

The method of enumeration of surviving cells used by VCC is termed quantitative growth kinetics (QGK). It relates the kinetic time taken for the turbidity of a bacterial batch microbiological culture in a well of a 96-well microplate to reach a threshold difference in turbidity to a 10-fold dilution series of calibration growth curves.

Quantification of the number of viable cells is done using a process mathematically identical to quantitative real-time polymerase chain reaction (QPCR), except with QGK cells, rather than copies of PCR products, grow exponentially. The time taken to reach the threshold is called the "threshold time", T_{t}, which is equivalent to the QPCR value "cycle time" or C_{t}.

There are at least five processes that cause delays in threshold times in VCC assays:

1. Adhesion, causing cells to stick to the microplate and possibly form biofilms. Unless these cells happen to be directly in the light path, their growth will not affect optical density readings.
2. Cohesion, causing cells to aggregate into clumps of various sizes instead of a homogeneous suspension of individual cells undergoing binary fission. Cohesion can cause imprecision and fluctuations in T_{t}. Cohesive clumps may also be adhesive, leading to both imprecision due to cohesion and inaccuracy (increased T_{t}) due to adhesion.
3. Bacteriostatic activity, causing cells to become unable to enter exponential growth even though they are not killed. Transient bacteriostatic activity can cause lag times, increasing T_{t}.
4. The metabolic lag phase of bacterial growth. Such a lag phase would be expected to occur in the assay as cells growing slowly or not at all during the initial exposure to antimicrobial peptides in the low-salt buffer are shifted to exponential growth upon addition of twice-concentrated rich media. If this metabolic lag phase increases in the presence of the antimicrobial peptide, it could be considered a form of transient bacteriostatic activity in category 3, above, although other sources of transient bacteriostatic activity, such as a delay due to the time required for the repair of damaged cell structures such as cell walls or cell membranes, are possible.
5. Bactericidal activity, or killing. Fewer surviving cells cause a delay in T_{t} as the survivors take longer to produce the same amount of turbidity through exponential growth. If all other processes causing increases in T_{t} are negligible, the VCC assay becomes a bactericidal assay and T_{t} can be used to enumerate viable bacteria by QGK. In this simplified case, VCC "virtual survival" results are equivalent to the "survival" results of a traditional colony count bactericidal assay.

== Bacteria ==
VCC was initially employed to quantify the antibacterial activity of peptides against six strains of Escherichia coli, Staphylococcus aureus, Bacillus cereus, and Enterobacter aerogenes. Commonly, a standard Gram-negative and Gram-positive quality control strain are compared. Escherichia coli ATCC 25922 and Staphylococcus aureus ATCC 29213 have been used as the standard Gram-negative and Gram-positive strains, respectively. VCC has also been applied to Bacillus anthracis, the causative agent of anthrax. In addition, VCC has been applied to Salmonella enterica serovar Typhimurium and Acinetobacter baumannii.

== Antimicrobial peptides ==
The initial virtual colony count study measured the activity of all six human alpha defensins concurrently on the same 96-well plate: HNP1, HNP2, HNP3, HNP4, HD5, and HD6. Subsequently, mutated forms of some of those six defensins were studied by VCC. A conserved glycine in a beta bulge in HNP2 was replaced with a series of D-amino acids resulting in VCC activity proportional to side chain hydrophobicity and charge. VCC showed that N-terminally acetylated and/or C-terminally amidated HNP2 activity is proportional to electrostatic charge. VCC results were again proportional to charge for a series of salt bridge-disrupting mutants, suggesting that the salt bridge is not required for HNP2 function. VCC measured the importance of N-terminal natural and artificial pro segments of the propeptide HNP1, dramatically altering activity against Escherichia coli and Staphylococcus aureus. Enantiomer forms of HNP1, HNP4, HD5 and Beta-defensin 2 composed entirely of D-amino acids suggested differing mechanisms of defensin activity against Gram-positive and Gram-negative bacteria. VCC results of dimerization-impaired monomer and tethered dimer forms of HNP1 demonstrated the importance of dimerization. Replacing the conserved glycine with L-alanine resulted in subtle VCC differences. Comprehensive alanine scanning mutagenesis of HNP1 and HD5 demonstrated the importance of bulky hydrophobic residues. HD5 disulfide reduction impaired VCC activity but enhanced lipopolysaccharide binding activity against three Gram negative strains. HD5 variants with one disulfide bond or no disulfide bonds exhibited greatly decreased VCC activity against A. baumannii, whereas a simplified derivative of HD5 constructed by disulfide reduction and arginine introduction displayed potent activity against a multidrug resistant strain of A. baumannii. These studies have been expanded to include additional beta defensins, theta defensins, and the human cathelicidin LL-37 and related peptides. Virtual colony count results of a study of the mouse cryptdins showed that the killing of E. coli by cryptdins is generally independent of their tertiary and quaternary structures that are important for the killing of S. aureus, which is indicative of two distinct mechanisms of action.

== Inoculum effect ==
An inoculum effect has been previously described for many antimicrobial agents, such that the agent is less effective when more bacteria are added to the assay. This effect is often observed with beta lactams when assayed against beta lactamase producing bacteria. The inoculum effect was potentially relevant to a study of HNP1, pro LL-37 and LL-37 that included both traditional colony counting and VCC side by side. In that report, it was found that traditional colony count survival values were less than virtual survival values for all peptides and strains tested. Because the inoculum of bacteria was 20-fold greater in the VCC assay compared to the standardized traditional colony count protocol used, the difference could have been due to an inoculum effect, although the effect would have been the reverse of the inoculum effect normally seen with other antimicrobial agents, since the higher inoculum showed more activity. This possibility was investigated in a series of VCC experiments mainly focusing on the defensin HNP1 and the bacterial strains E. coli, S. aureus and B. cereus. The results of six experiments demonstrated a pronounced inoculum effect of HNP1 against E. coli.

== Algorithms to analyze quantitative growth kinetics ==
Complex Microsoft Excel spreadsheets used for the calculation of virtual survival and virtual lethal dose values, and a Visual Basic macro used to calculate threshold times, have been published. The spreadsheets and macro have also been deposited in GitHub.

== Safe and effective pipetting technique ==
VCC users are cautioned to transfer cells in a small volume such as 10 microliters beneath a larger volume such as 90 microliters, similar to the QGK calibration curves shown above and the calibration curves reported in the initial VCC publication, but unlike the experimental procedure used to test defensin activity in that same paper. The improved pipetting technique was described in 2011 in the study of the biosafety level 3 (BSL-3) pathogen Bacillus anthracis. The original method published in 2005 involved the transfer of 50 microliters of cell suspensions to 50 microliters of liquid, which generates froth, bubbles and turbidity that is incompatible with a turbidimetric method when cells are transferred directly to the bottoms of the wells beneath the phosphate buffer solutions. Avoiding this problem by adding cell suspensions as droplets from above can cause aerosols that result in cross-contamination. Bioaerosols of hazardous bacteria can also pose safety risks that can be reduced by conducting experiments within a biosafety cabinet.
