= Paneth cell =

Anti-microbial epithelial cell of the small intestine

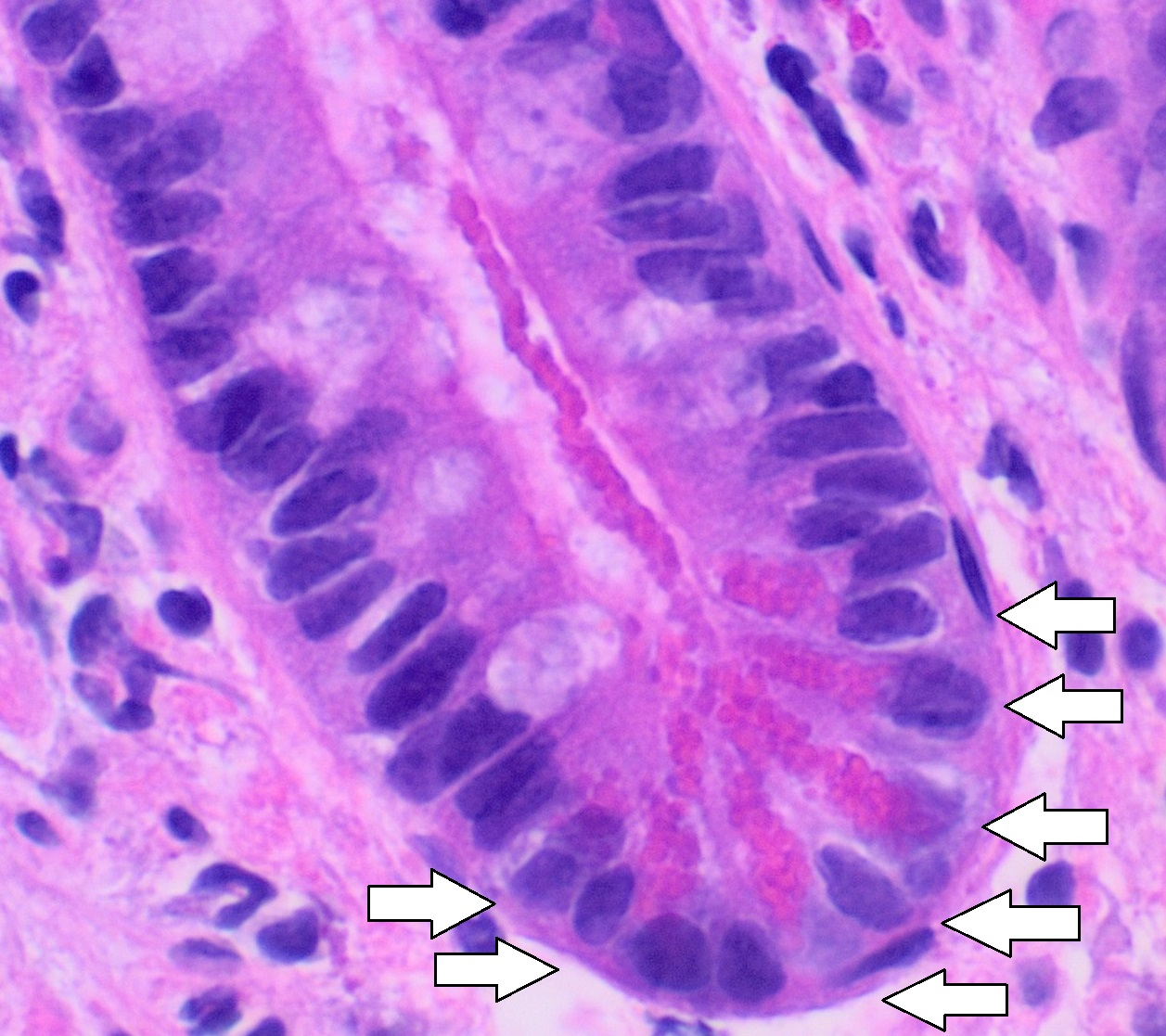
- Paneth cells, located at the base of the crypts of the small intestinal mucosa, and displaying bright red cytoplasmic granules. H&E stain.

Details
- Location: Small intestine epithelium

Identifiers
- Latin: cellula panethensis
- MeSH: D019879
- TH: H3.04.03.0.00017
- FMA: 62897

Paneth cells are cells in the small intestine epithelium, alongside goblet cells, enterocytes, and enteroendocrine cells. Some can also be found in the cecum and appendix. They lie interspersed between intestinal stem cells in the intestinal glands (also called crypts of Lieberkühn) and under the large eosinophilic refractile granules that occupy most of their cytoplasm.

When exposed to bacteria or bacterial antigens, Paneth cells secrete several anti-microbial compounds (notably defensins and lysozyme) that are known to be important in immunity and host-defense into the lumen of the intestinal gland, thereby contributing to maintenance of the gastrointestinal barrier by controlling the enteric bacteria. Therefore, Paneth cells play a role in the innate immune system.

Paneth cells are named after 19th-century pathologist Joseph Paneth.

== Structure ==
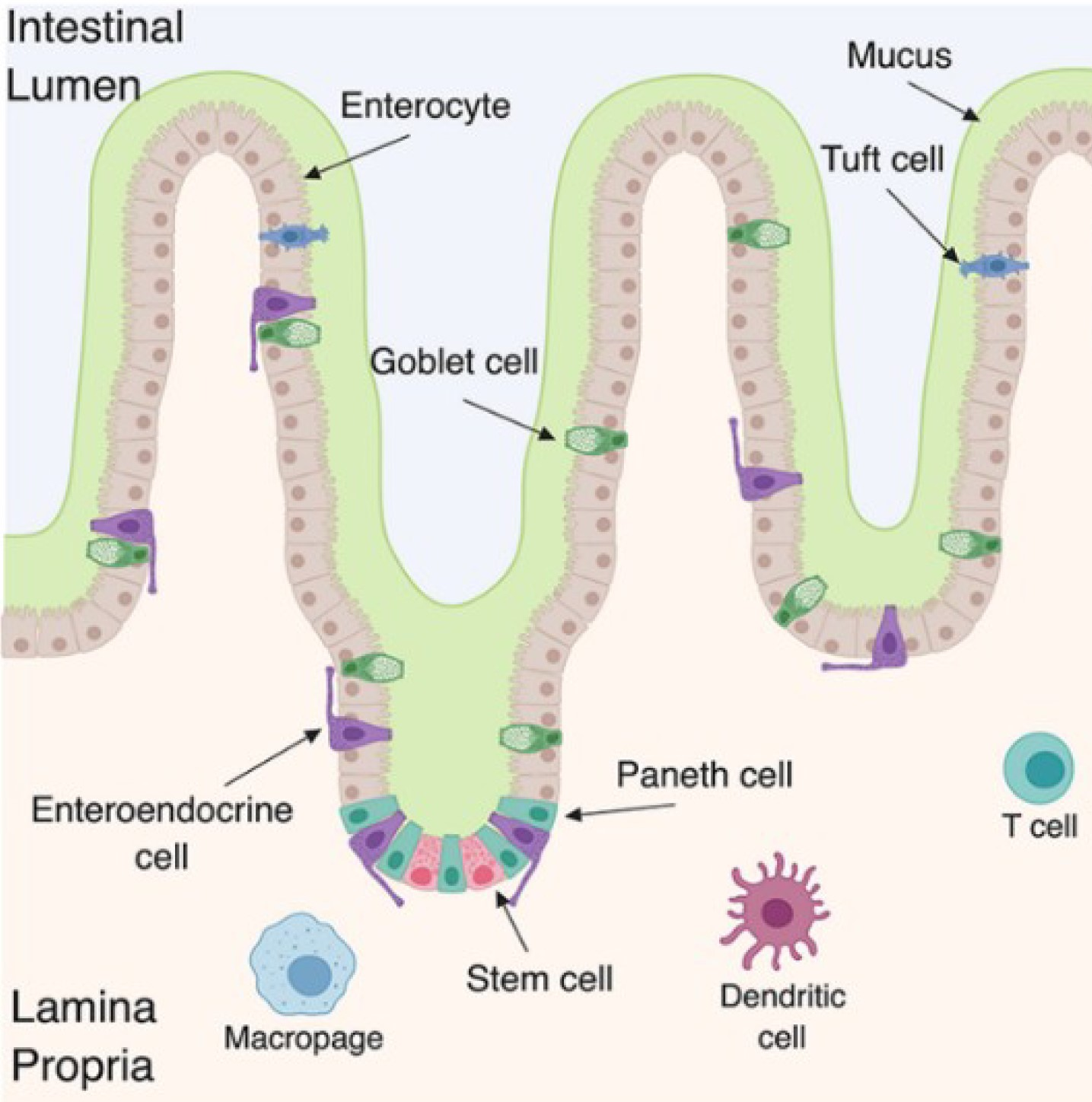
The gastrointestinal tract is composed of numerous cell types that are important for immune activation and barrier surface defenses. The gastrointestinal epithelium is composed of enterocytes, goblet cells, Paneth cells, enteroendocrine cells, tuft cells, and stem cells. In contrast, the lamina propria is composed of immune cells such as dendritic cells, T cells, and macrophages.

Paneth cells are found throughout the small intestine and the appendix at the base of the intestinal glands. There is an increase in Paneth cell numbers towards the end of the small intestine. Like the other epithelial cell lineages in the small intestine, Paneth cells originate at the stem cell region near the bottom of the gland. There are on average 5–12 Paneth cells in each small intestinal crypt.

Unlike the other epithelial cell types, Paneth cells migrate downward from the stem cell region and settle just adjacent to it. This close relationship to the stem cell region suggests that Paneth cells are important in defending the gland stem cells from microbial damage, although their function is not entirely known. Furthermore, among the four aforementioned intestinal cell lineages, Paneth cells live the longest (approximately 57 days).

== Function ==
Paneth cells secrete antimicrobial peptides and proteins, which are "key mediators of host-microbe interactions, including homeostatic balance with colonizing microbiota and innate immune protection from enteric pathogens."

Small intestinal crypts house stem cells that serve to constantly replenish epithelial cells that die and are lost from the villi. Paneth cells support the physical barrier of the epithelium by providing essential niche signals to their neighboring intestinal stem cells. Protection and stimulation of these stem cells is essential for long-term maintenance of the intestinal epithelium, in which Paneth cells play a critical role.

Paneth cells display merocrine secretion, that is, secretion via exocytosis.

=== Sensing microbiota ===
Paneth cells are stimulated to secrete defensins when exposed to bacteria (both Gram positive and Gram-negative types), or such bacterial products as lipopolysaccharide, lipoteichoic acid, muramyl dipeptide and lipid A. They are also stimulated by cholinergic signaling normally preceding the arrival of food which potentially may contain a new bacterial load.

Paneth cells sense bacteria via MyD88-dependent toll-like receptor (TLR) activation which then triggers antimicrobial action. For example, research showed that in the secretory granules, murine and human Paneth cells express high levels of TLR9. TLR9 react to CpG-ODN and unmethylated oligonucleotides, pathogen-associated molecular patterns (PAMPs) typical for bacterial DNA. Internalizing these PAMPs and activating TLR9 leads to degranulation and release of antimicrobial peptides and other secretions. Surprisingly, murine Paneth cells do not express mRNA transcripts for TLR4.

=== Antimicrobial secretions ===
The principal defense molecules secreted by Paneth cells are alpha-defensins, which are known as cryptdins in mice. These peptides have hydrophobic and positively charged domains that can interact with phospholipids in cell membranes. This structure allows defensins to insert into membranes, where they interact with one another to form pores that disrupt membrane function, leading to cell lysis. Due to the higher concentration of negatively charged phospholipids in bacterial than vertebrate cell membranes, defensins preferentially bind to and disrupt bacterial cells, sparing the cells they are functioning to protect.

Human Paneth cells produce two α-defensins known as human α-defensin HD-5 (DEFA5) and HD-6 (DEFA6). HD-5 has a wide spectrum of killing activity against both Gram positive and Gram negative bacteria as well as fungi (Listeria monocytogenes, Escherichia coli, Salmonella typhimurium, and Candida albicans). The antimicrobial activity of HD-6 consists of self-assembling into extracellular nets that entrap bacteria in the intestine and thereby preventing their translocation across the epithelial barrier.

Human Paneth cells also produce other AMPs including lysozyme, secretory phospholipase A2, and regenerating islet-derived protein IIIA. Lysozyme is an antimicrobial enzyme that dissolves the cell walls of many bacteria, and phospholipase A2 is an enzyme specialized in the lysis of bacterial phospholipids . This battery of secretory molecules gives Paneth cells a potent arsenal against a broad spectrum of agents, including bacteria, fungi and even some enveloped viruses.

=== Secretory autophagy ===
During conventional protein secretion, proteins are transported through the ER-Golgi complex packaged in secretory granules and released to the extracellular space. Should invasive pathogens disrupt the Golgi apparatus, causing an impairment in the Paneth cell secretion of antimicrobial proteins, an alternative secretion pathway exists: it has been shown that lysozyme can be rerouted through secretory autophagy. In secretory autophagy, cargo is transported in an LC3+ vesicle and discharged at the plasma membrane, thus bypassing the ER-Golgi complex. Not all bacteria prompts secretory autophagy: commensal bacteria, for example, does not cause Golgi breakdown and therefore does not trigger the secretory autophagy of lysozyme. A dysfunction in secretory autophagy is thought to be a possible contributing factor to Crohn's disease.

=== Phagocytic function ===
Paneth cells maintain the health of the intestine by acting as macrophages; it has been shown that Paneth cells clear dying cells via apoptotic cell uptake. The phagocytic function of Paneth cells was discovered using a series of experiments, one of which made use of mice that were radiated with a low dose Cesium-137 (137Cs), mimicking chemotherapy undergone by cancer patients. These findings may be significant for addressing the side effects suffered by cancer patient whose intestinal health is damaged by chemotherapy: approximately 40% of all cancer therapy patients experience gastrointestinal (GI) mucositis during their treatment, with the number jumping to 80% in patients receiving abdominal or pelvic irradiation.

=== Epithelium maintenance ===
Paneth cells participate in the Wnt signaling pathway and Notch signalling pathway, which regulate proliferation of intestinal stem cells and enterocytes necessary for epithelium cell renewal. They express the canonical Wnt ligands: Wnt3a, Wnt9b, and Wnt11, which bind to Frizzled receptors on intestinal stem cells to drive β-catenin/Tcf signaling. Paneth cells are also a major source of Notch ligands DLL1 and DLL4, binding to Notch receptors Notch1 and Notch2 on intestinal stem cells and enterocyte progenitors.

Recently, however, it has been discovered that the regenerative potential of intestinal epithelial cells declines over time as a result of aged Paneth cells secreting the protein Notum, which is an extracellular inhibitor of Wnt signaling. If Notum secretion is inhibited, the regenerative potential of the intestinal epithelium could increase.

=== Zinc ===
It has been established that zinc is essential for the function of Paneth cells. A defect in the Zn transporter (ZnT)2 impairs Paneth cell function by causing uncoordinated granule secretion. Mice lacking the (ZnT)2 transporter not only exhibit impaired granule secretion, they also suffer from increased inflammatory response to lipopolysaccharide and are less capable of bactericidal activity. Normally, zinc is stored in the secretory granules and, upon degranulation, is released in the lumen. It has been speculated that the storage of heavy metals contributes to direct antimicrobial toxicity, as Zn is released upon cholinergic PC stimulation.

Zinc deficiency is also implicated in alcohol‐induced Paneth cell α‐defensin dysfunction, which contributes to alcohol-related steatohepatitis. Zinc can stabilize human α‐defensin 5 (HD5), which is responsible for microbiome homeostasis. In line with this, the administration of HD5 can effectively alter the microbiome (especially by increasing Akkermansia muciniphila), and reverse the damage inflicted on the microbiome by excessive alcohol consumption. Dietary zinc deficiency on the other hand exacerbates the deleterious effect of alcohol on the bactericidal activity of Paneth cells.

== Clinical significance ==
Abnormal Paneth cells with reduced expression or secretion of defensins HD-5 and HD-6 (in human) and antimicrobial peptides are associated with inflammatory bowel disease. In addition to that, several of the Crohn's disease-risk alleles are associated with Paneth cell dysfunction are involved in processes such as autophagy, the unfolded protein response, and the regulation of mitochondrial function.

It is believed that the dysfunction of Paneth cells compromises antimicrobial peptides leading to a microbiota composition shift, and even dysbiosis. Crohn's disease patients with a higher percentage of abnormal Paneth cells showed significantly reduced bacterial diversity compared with patients with a lower percentage of abnormal Paneth cells, reflecting a reduced abundance of anti-inflammatory microbes. Collectively, these findings support the theory that Paneth cell dysfunction may lead to a dysbiotic microbiota that, in turn, could predispose an individual to the development of Crohn's disease. However, it is yet to be established whether Paneth cell dysfunction is the cause of dysbiosis, or its concomitant effect.

=== Necrotizing enterocolitis ===
Paneth cells develop gradually during gestation and therefore preterm babies might not have them in sufficient numbers. This leaves preterm babies vulnerable to necrotizing enterocolitis. About mid-way through the development of the small intestine, cathelicidin secretion is replaced by α-defensin secretion. The small intestine of the premature baby is at this transition stage when the baby is born, making preterm babies susceptible to intestinal injury and, subsequently, to necrotizing enterocolitis. It should furthermore be noted that early Paneth cells do not possess fully functional, mature granules.

The mechanism that links Paneth cells to necrotizing enterocolitis remains unclear, but it has been theorized that a bloom of Proteobacteria and, more specifically, Enterobacteriaceae species precedes the development of the condition. When an inflammation then subsequently occurs, nitrates can be fermented by Enterobacteriaceae sp. but not by obligate anaerobes, which cannot use nitrates as a growth substrate. Thus, Proteobacteria are able to use this selective pressure to out-compete the obligate anaerobic Firmicutes and Bacteroidetes, resulting in their overgrowth and consequent dysbiosis.

The process is thought to begin when the premature infant is exposed to foreign antigens via formula feeding. Inflammatory cytokines are subsequently released, creating a more aerobic state leading to a competitive advantage for Proteobacteria. As the microbiome becomes more dysbiotic, anti-inflammatory mechanisms weaken, which contributes to a cycle of increasing intestinal inflammation. The inflammation leads to a further loss in Paneth cells density and function, resulting in the impairment of AMP secretion and the destruction of the stem cell niche.

=== Non-alcoholic fatty liver disease ===
Whereas the role of Paneth cells in irritable bowel syndrome and Crohn's disease has received ample attention, relatively little is known about the effect Panth cell impairment has on the pathogenesis of non-alcoholic steato-hepatitis or non-alcoholic fatty liver disease.

Murine models indicate that obesity may decrease the secretion of α-defensin from Paneth cells, leading to dysbiosis. and at least one murine model suggests that when α-defensin levels in the intestinal lumen are restored by intravenous administration of R-Spondin1 to induce Paneth cell regeneration, liver fibrosis is ameliorated as a result of the dysbiosis resolving. It is hypothesized that selective microbicidal activities, as well as increasing Muribaculaceae and decreasing Harryflintia, contribute to amelioration in fibrogenesis.

One study described the injection of dithizone, which can disrupt cell granulates, into mice that were fed a high-fat diet in order to identify Paneth-cell-oriented microbial alterations. The application of dithizone improved high-fat diet glucose intolerance and insulin resistance and was associated with an alleviation in the severity of liver steatosis in HFD mice, possibly through gut microbiome modulation involving the increase in Bacteroides. It has therefore been suggested that microbiome-targeted therapies may have a role in the treatment of non-alcoholic fatty liver disease.

Further research is needed to elucidate the connection between Paneth cells and the gut-liver-axis.

== See also ==
- List of human cell types derived from the germ layers
- List of distinct cell types in the adult human body
