= DEFA3 =

Protein-coding gene in the species Homo sapiens

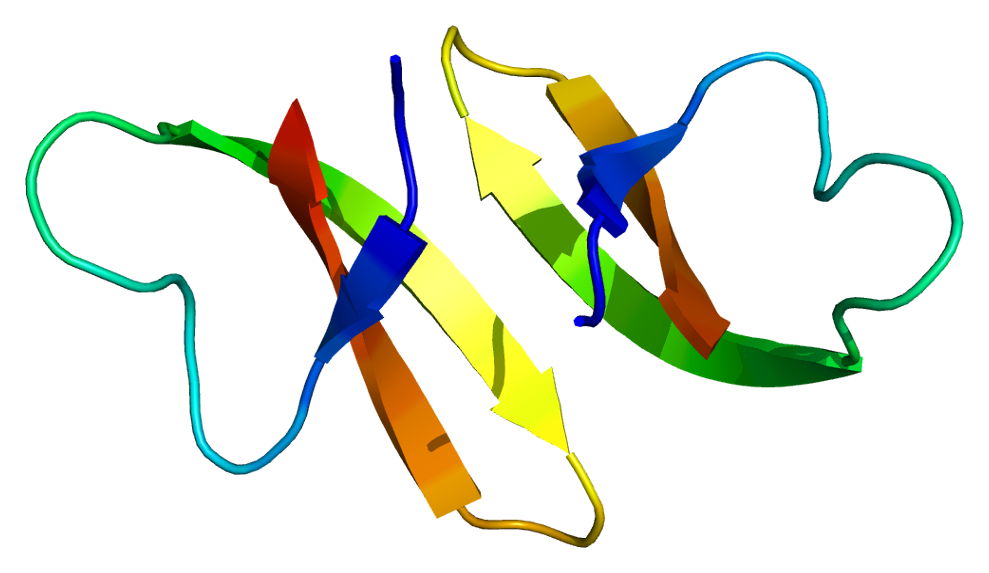

Identifiers
- Aliases: DEFA3, DEF3, HNP-3, HNP3, HP-3, HP3, defensin alpha 3
- External IDs: OMIM: 604522; GeneCards: DEFA3
Available structures
PDB	Human UniProt search: PDBe RCSB
PDB	List of PDB id codes 1DFN, 1ZMH, 1ZMI, 1ZMK, 2PM4, 2PM5

Gene location (Human)
Chr.	Chromosome 8 (human)
Band	8p23.1	Start	7,015,869 bp
Band	8p23.1	End	7,018,297 bp
RNA expression pattern
Bgee	Human / Mouse (ortholog); Top expressed in: bone marrow; bone marrow cell; monocyte; granulocyte; right lung; blood; spleen; upper lobe of left lung; placenta; right lobe of liver / n/a; More reference expression data
BioGPS	n/a
Gene ontology
Molecular function	protein homodimerization activity; molecular function
Cellular component	extracellular region; extracellular exosome; azurophil granule lumen; Golgi lumen; extracellular space
Biological process	defense response to fungus; intracellular estrogen receptor signaling pathway; defense response to bacterium; innate immune response in mucosa; defense response; defense response to virus; antimicrobial humoral response; antimicrobial humoral immune response mediated by antimicrobial peptide; killing of cells of other organism; antibacterial humoral response; defense response to Gram-negative bacterium; defense response to Gram-positive bacterium; membrane disruption in other organism; cellular response to lipopolysaccharide
Sources:Amigo / QuickGO
Orthologs
Databases	NCBI: entry; OMA: entry
Species	Human	Mouse
Entrez	1668	n/a
Ensembl	ENSG00000239839; ENSG00000284835	n/a
UniProt	P59666	n/a
RefSeq (mRNA)	NM_005217	n/a
RefSeq (protein)	NP_005208	n/a
Location (UCSC)	Chr 8: 7.02 – 7.02 Mb	n/a
PubMed search		n/a
- Wikidata
View/Edit Human	View/Edit Mouse

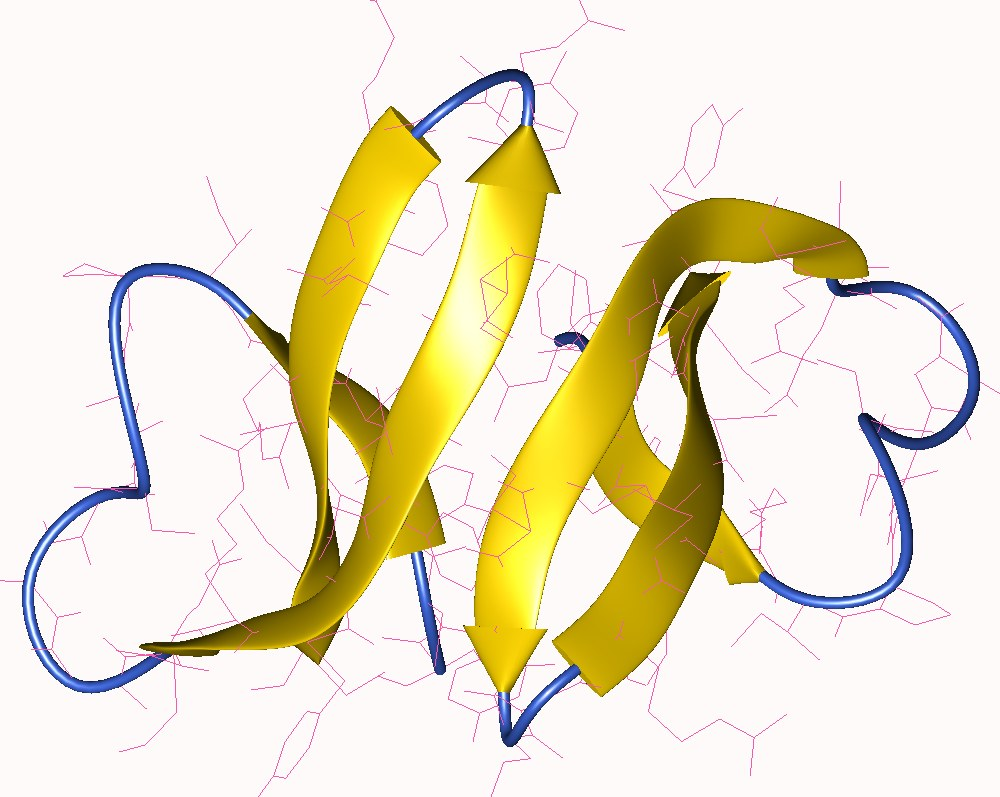
Defensin 3, dimer, Human.

Defensin, alpha 3 (DEFA3) also known as human alpha defensin 3, human neutrophil peptide 3 (HNP-3) or neutrophil defensin 3 is a human protein that is encoded by the DEFA3 gene. Human alpha defensin 3 belongs to the alpha defensin family of antimicrobial peptides.

== Function ==
Defensins are a family of microbicidal and cytotoxic peptides thought to be involved in host defense. They are abundant in the granules of neutrophils and also found in the epithelia of mucosal surfaces such as those of the intestine, respiratory tract, urinary tract, and vagina. Members of the defensin family are highly similar in protein sequence and distinguished by a conserved cysteine motif. Several alpha defensin genes are clustered on chromosome 8. The protein encoded by this gene, defensin, alpha 3, is found in the microbicidal granules of neutrophils and likely plays a role in phagocyte-mediated host defense. Several alpha defensin genes are clustered on chromosome 8. This peptide differs from defensin, alpha 1 by only one amino acid. This gene and the gene encoding defensin, alpha 1 are both subject to copy number variation.
