= Tapeta =

Tapeta may refer to:

- Tapetum lucidum, a tissue in the eye
- Tapeta, a track surface in horse racing
- Tapeta, a town in Nimba County, Liberia
