= Mir-938 microRNA precursor family =

mir-938

Identifiers
- Symbol: mir-938
- Rfam: RF00964
- miRBase family: MIPF0000469

Other data
- RNA type: microRNA
- Domain(s): Eukaryota;
- PDB structures: PDBe

In molecular biology mir-938 microRNA is a short RNA molecule. MicroRNAs function to regulate the expression levels of other genes by several mechanisms.

== miR-938 and the TGF-β pathway ==
miR-938 has been found to directly target the SMAD3 gene, which encodes the main downstream TGF-β polypeptide SMAD3. This microRNA is overexpressed in non-functioning pituitary adenomas (NFPAs) compared with normal pituitary tissue. Downregulation of TGF-β signalling is likely to play a role in the regulation of signalling pathways in NFPA tumorigenesis, thus also implicating SMAD3 and miR-938.

== See also ==
- MicroRNA
