= PARD3B =

Protein-coding gene in the species Homo sapiens

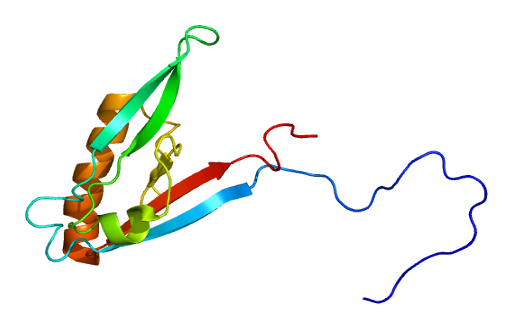

Identifiers
- Aliases: PARD3B, ALS2CR19, PAR3B, PAR3L, PAR3LC, PAR3beta, Par3Lb, par-3 family cell polarity regulator beta
- External IDs: MGI: 1919301; GeneCards: PARD3B

Gene location (Human)
Chr.	Chromosome 2 (human)
Band	2q33.3	Start	204,545,475 bp
Band	2q33.3	End	205,620,162 bp

Gene location (Mouse)
Chr.	Chromosome 1 (mouse)
Band	1|1 C2	Start	61,677,983 bp
Band	1|1 C2	End	62,681,443 bp
RNA expression pattern
Bgee	Human / Mouse (ortholog); Top expressed in: sural nerve; ventricular zone; Achilles tendon; epithelium of colon; saphenous vein; tibial arteries; mucosa of ileum; testicle; gonad; skin of hip / Top expressed in: Rostral migratory stream; crypt of lieberkuhn of small intestine; internal carotid artery; external carotid artery; sciatic nerve; lumbar spinal ganglion; renal corpuscle; ciliary body; iris; intestinal villus; More reference expression data
BioGPS	n/a
Gene ontology
Molecular function	protein binding; phosphatidylinositol binding
Cellular component	membrane; endomembrane system; bicellular tight junction; cell junction; nucleoplasm; nuclear body; protein-containing complex; cytoplasm; adherens junction; cell cortex; apical plasma membrane; apical junction complex
Biological process	cell division; cell cycle; microtubule cytoskeleton organization; cell adhesion; protein localization; establishment of cell polarity; establishment or maintenance of epithelial cell apical/basal polarity; establishment of centrosome localization
Sources:Amigo / QuickGO
Orthologs
Databases	NCBI: entry; OMA: entry
Species	Human	Mouse
Entrez	117583	72823
Ensembl	ENSG00000116117	ENSMUSG00000052062
UniProt	Q8TEW8	Q9CSB4
RefSeq (mRNA)	NM_001302769; NM_057177; NM_152526; NM_205863	NM_001081050
RefSeq (protein)	NP_001289698; NP_476518; NP_689739; NP_995585	NP_001074519
Location (UCSC)	Chr 2: 204.55 – 205.62 Mb	Chr 1: 61.68 – 62.68 Mb
PubMed search
- Wikidata
View/Edit Human	View/Edit Mouse

Partitioning defective 3 homolog B is a protein that in humans is encoded by the PARD3B gene.

== Interactions ==
PARD3B has been shown to interact with Mothers against decapentaplegic homolog 3.
