= HD5 =

HD5 may refer to:

- HD5 of MediaCorp TV in Singapore
- HD5 of Euro1080 owned by Alfacam in Belgium
- HD 5 (HIP 429, BD+01 4825), a star in the Henry Draper Catalogue. It is a G5 star located at (J2000.0; 00^{h} 05^{m} 10.1829^{s}; +02° 23′ 49.949″)
- Human Alpha Defensin 5, the DEFA5 gene product
