= Tapetum lucidum =

Layer of eye tissue which aids in night vision

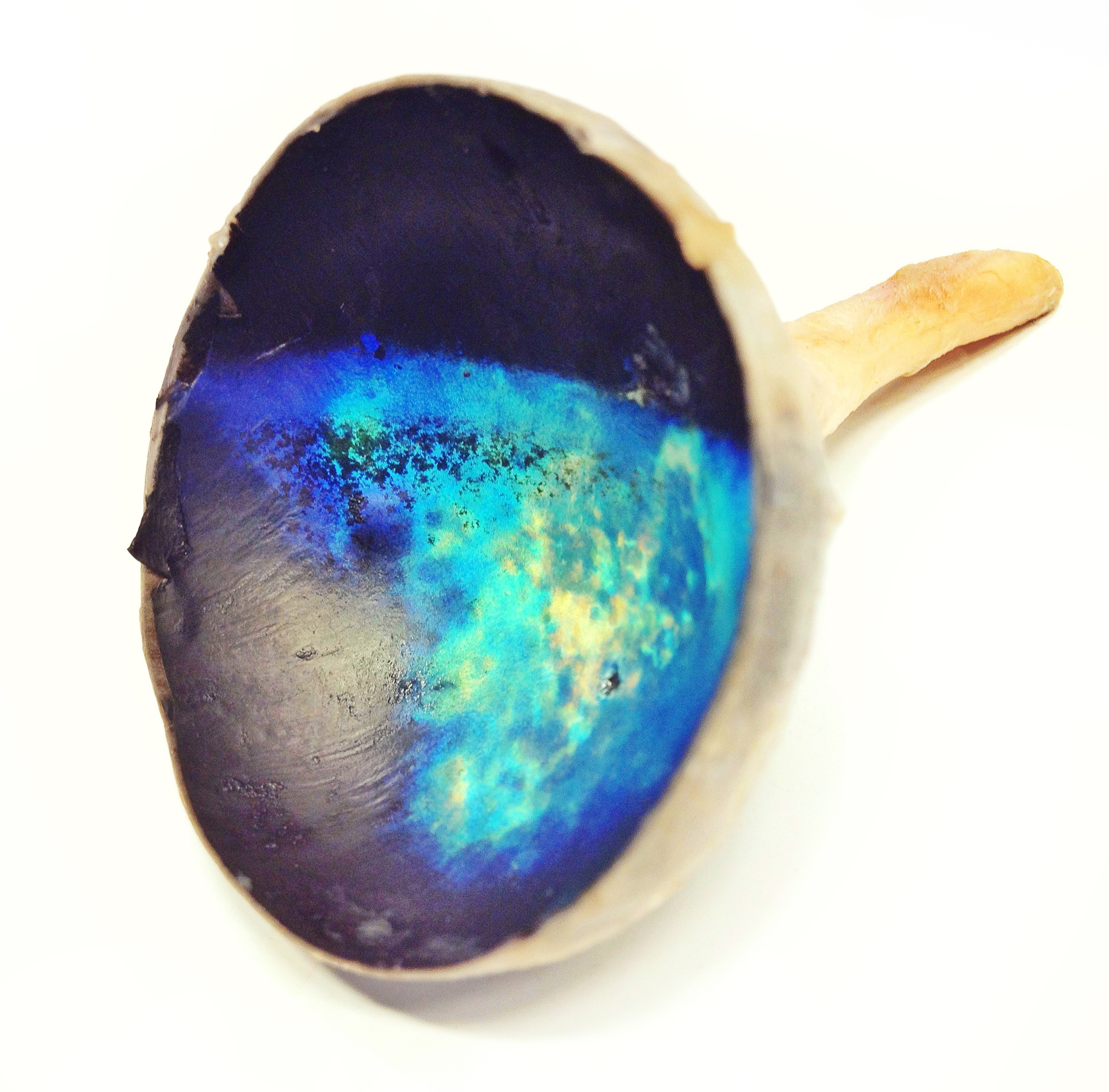
The dark blue, teal, and gold tapetum lucidum from the eye of a cow

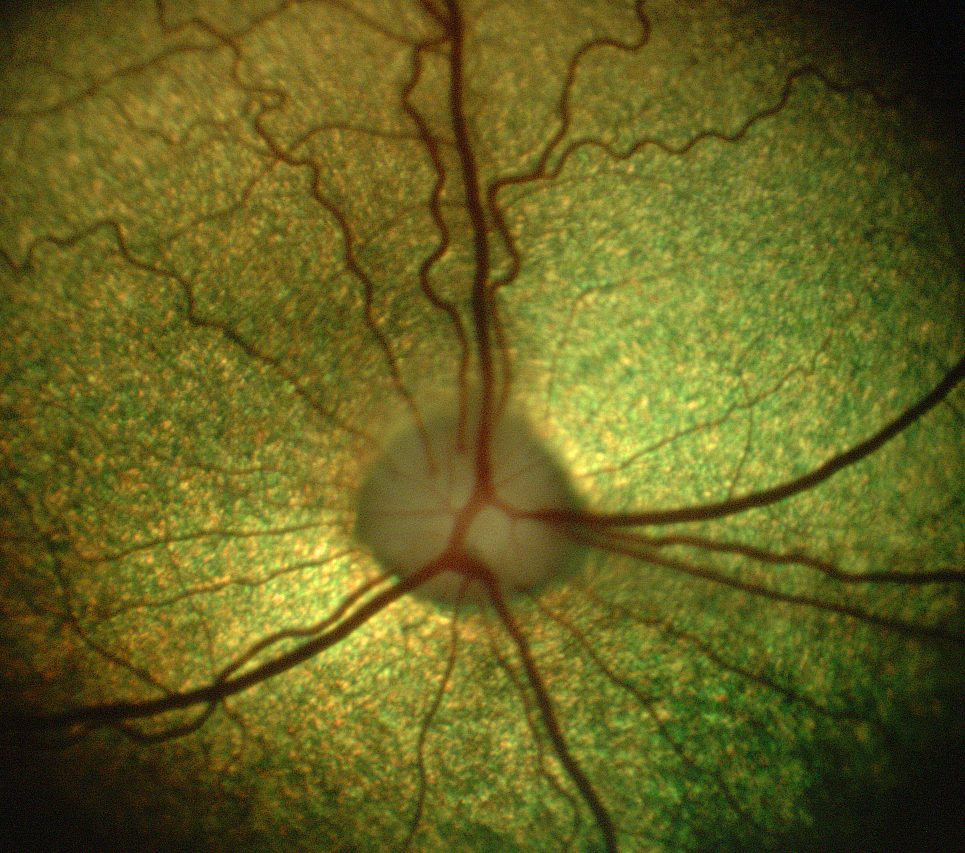
Retina of a mongrel dog with strong tapetal reflex

The tapetum lucidum (Latin for 'bright tapestry, coverlet'; /təˈpiːtəm ˈluːsɪdəm/ tə-PEE-təm LOO-sih-dəm; pl.: tapeta lucida) is a layer of tissue in the eye of many vertebrates and some other animals. Lying immediately behind the retina, it is a retroreflector. It reflects visible light back through the retina, increasing the light available to the photoreceptors (although slightly blurring the image).

The tapetum lucidum contributes to the superior night vision of some animals. Many of these animals are nocturnal, especially carnivores, while others are deep-sea animals. Similar adaptations occur in some species of spiders. Haplorhine primates, including humans, are diurnal and lack a tapetum lucidum. (Note: The one exception to this generalization is the neotropical night monkey genus Aotus; they are sometimes described as having a tapetum lucidum of collagen fibrils, but lack the reflective riboflavin crystals present in the eyes of nocturnal strepsirrhine primates.)

== Function and mechanism ==
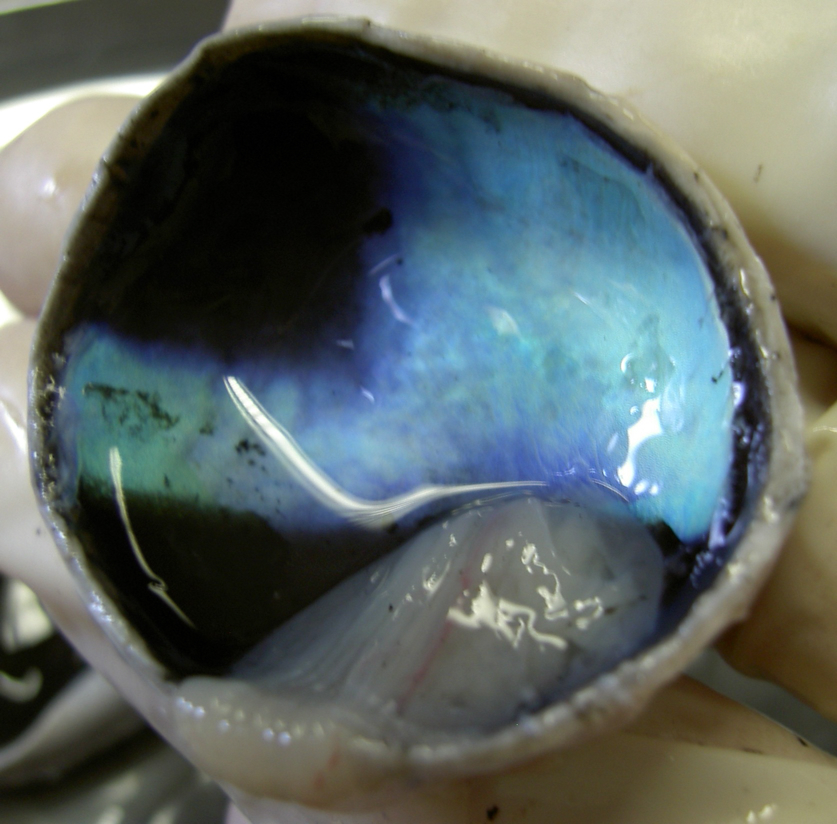
Choroid dissected from a calf's eye, tapetum lucidum appearing iridescent blue

The presence of a tapetum lucidum enables animals to see in dimmer light than would otherwise be possible. The tapetum lucidum, which is iridescent, reflects light roughly on the interference principles of thin-film optics, as seen in other iridescent tissues. However, the tapetum lucidum cells are leucophores, not iridophores.

The tapetum functions as a retroreflector which reflects light directly back along the light path. This serves to match the original and reflected light, thus maintaining the sharpness and contrast of the image on the retina. The tapetum lucidum reflects with constructive interference, thus increasing the quantity of light passing through the retina. In the cat, the tapetum lucidum decreases the absolute threshold for vision, but does not materially change spectral sensitivity. When a tapetum lucidum is present, its location on the eyeball varies with the placement of the eyeball in the head.

Apart from its eyeshine, the tapetum lucidum itself has a color. It is often described as iridescent. In tigers, it is greenish. In ruminants, it may be golden green with a blue periphery, or whitish or pale blue with a lavender periphery. In dogs, it may be whitish with a blue periphery. The color in reindeer changes seasonally, allowing the animals to better avoid predators in low-light winter at the price of blurrier vision.

== Classification ==
A classification of anatomical variants of tapeta lucida defines four types:

1. Retinal tapetum, as seen in teleosts (with a variety of reflecting materials from lipids to phenols), crocodiles (with guanine), marsupials (with lipid spheres), and fruit bats (with phospholipids). The tapetum lucidum is within the retinal pigment epithelium; in the other three types the tapetum is within the choroid behind the retina. Two anatomical classes can be distinguished: occlusible and non-occlusible.
  - The brownsnout spookfish has an extraordinary focusing mirror derived from a retinal tapetum.
2. Choroidal guainine tapetum, as seen in cartilaginous fish. The tapetum is a palisade of cells containing stacks of flat hexagonal crystals of guanine.
3. Choroidal tapetum cellulosum, as seen in carnivores, rodents, and cetacea. The tapetum consists of layers of cells containing organized, highly refractive crystals. These crystals are diverse in shape and makeup: dogs and ferrets use zinc, cats use riboflavin and zinc, and lemurs use only riboflavin.
4. Choroidal tapetum fibrosum, as seen in cows, sheep, goats, and horses. The tapetum is an array of extracellular fibers, most commonly collagen.

The functional differences between these four structural classes of tapeta lucida are not known.

== Variation across species ==
=== Primates ===
Humans, like other haplorhine primates, lack a tapetum lucidum as they are diurnal. Strepsirrhine primates are mostly nocturnal and, with the exception of several diurnal Eulemur species, have a tapetum lucidum of riboflavin crystals.

=== Dogs ===
In canids, the tapetum lucidum is found in the dorsal half of the eye's fundus. It consists of 9-20 layers of specialized rectangular cells between the choroid and retinal pigment epithelium, thinning towards the periphery. The cells contain zinc-rich rodlets arranged in parallel. The structure appears yellow-green in adults, though blue in puppies until four months of age. Zinc concentration varies among species, with red foxes showing highest levels, followed by Arctic foxes, then domestic dogs. A hereditary zinc-deficiency condition in some beagles results in degenerated tapetal cells with disrupted rodlet arrangement.

=== Cats ===
The tapetum lucidum in cats is renowned for its brilliance, even inspiring ancient Egyptians to believe it reflected the sun at night. This reflective layer is composed of 15-20 layers of cells arranged in a central pattern. This structure, denser than that of dogs, results in high reflectance, nearly 130 times that of humans. Its color is heterogeneous, varying with age and species due to factors like rodlet spacing, refractive index, and light interactions. Young cats exhibit a blue appearance, which shifts to yellow with age, with adult coloration ranging from light orange to green. While enhancing night vision, increased light scatter within the tapetum slightly compromises visual acuity.

=== Birds ===
Kiwi, stone-curlews, the boat-billed heron, the flightless kākāpō, and many nightjars, owls, and other night birds such as the swallow-tailed gull possess a tapetum lucidum. Nightjars use a retinal tapetum lucidum composed of lipids.

=== In spiders ===
Most species of spider also have a tapetum, which is located only in their smaller, lateral eyes; the larger central eyes have no such structure. This consists of reflective crystalline deposits and is thought to have a similar function to the structure of the same name in vertebrates. Four general patterns can be distinguished in spiders:

1. Primitive type (e.g. Mesothelae, Orthognatha) – a simple sheet behind the retina
2. Canoe-shape type (e.g. Araneidae, Theridiidae) – two lateral walls separated by a gap for the nerve fibres
3. Grated type (e.g. Lycosidae, Pisauridae) – a relatively complex, grill-shaped structure
4. No tapetum (e.g. Salticidae)

=== Mantis shrimp ===
At the pelagic larval stage, most of the Stomatopoda species (e.g. Oratosquilla oratoria) are largely transparent except their eyes. Therefore, eyeshine acts as a reflective camouflage, by reducing the visual contrast between the eyes and the surrounding water background, to decrease the chance of larvae being detected.

=== Vertebrates lacking a tapetum lucidum ===
Animals without tapetum lucidum include haplorhine primates, squirrels, some birds, red kangaroo, and pigs.

== Eyeshine ==
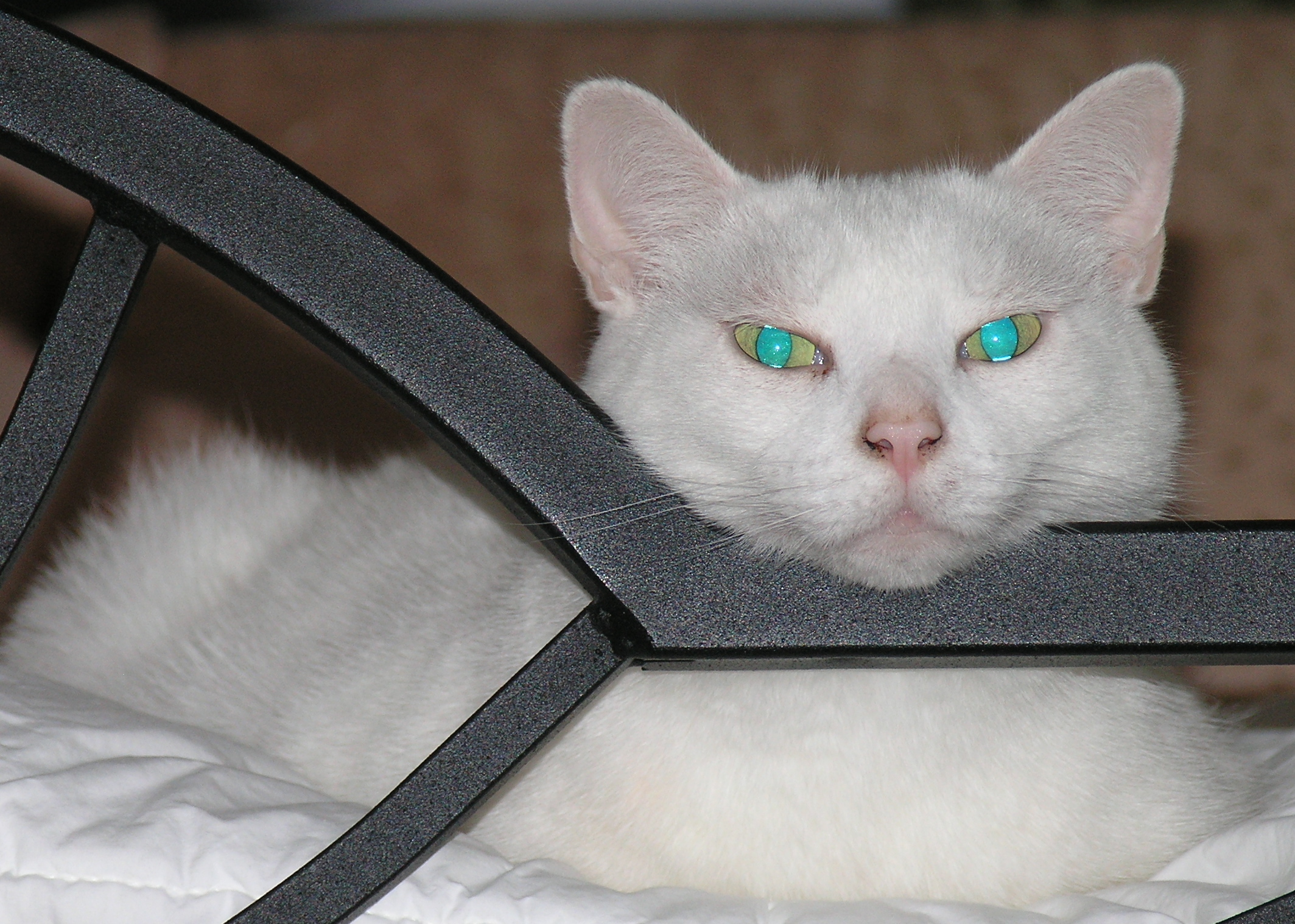
Reflection of camera flash from the tapetum lucidum

Eyeshine is a visible effect of the tapetum lucidum. When light shines into the eye of an animal having a tapetum lucidum, the pupil appears to glow. Eyeshine can be seen in many animals, in nature, and in flash photographs. In low light, a hand-held flashlight is sufficient to produce eyeshine that is visible to humans (despite their inferior night vision). Eyeshine occurs in a wide variety of colors including white, blue, green, yellow, pink, and red. However, since eyeshine is a type of iridescence, the color varies with the angle at which it is seen and the minerals which make up the reflective tapetum lucidum crystals. Individuals with heterochromia may display red eyeshine in the blue eye and other-colored eyeshine in the other eye. These include odd-eyed cats and bi-eyed dogs.

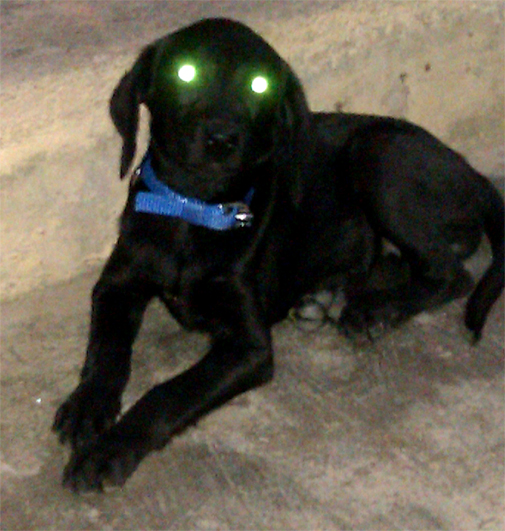
A three-month-old black Labrador puppy with apparent eyeshine

Although human eyes lack a tapetum lucidum, they still exhibit a weak reflection from the choroid, as can be seen in photography with the red-eye effect and with near-infrared eyeshine. Another effect in humans and other animals that may resemble eyeshine is leukocoria, which is a white shine indicative of abnormalities such as cataracts and cancers.

=== Usage ===
Humans can scan for eyeshine to detect and identify the species of animals in the dark and deploy search dogs and search horses at night. The color corresponds approximately to the type of tapetum lucidum, with some variation between species.

It has been speculated that some flashlight fish may use eyeshine both to detect and to communicate with other flashlight fish. American scientist Nathan H. Lents has proposed that the tapetum lucidum evolved in vertebrates, but not in cephalopods, which have a very similar eye, because of the backwards-facing nature of vertebrate photoreceptors. The tapetum boosts photosensitivity under conditions of low illumination, thus compensating for the suboptimal design of the vertebrate retina.

=== In photography ===
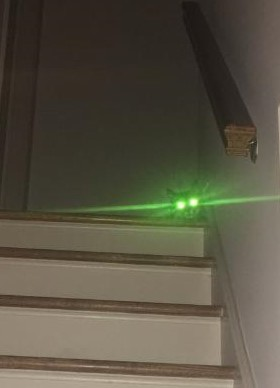
Reflective eyes of a cat visible from a camera flash

Traditionally, it has been difficult to take retinal images of animals with a tapetum lucidum because ophthalmoscopy devices designed for humans rely on a high level of on-axis illumination. This kind of illumination causes backscatter when it interacts with the tapetum. New devices with variable illumination can make this possible, however.

== Pathology ==
In dogs, certain drugs are known to disturb the precise organization of the crystals of the tapetum lucidum, thus compromising the dog's ability to see in low light. These drugs include ethambutol, macrolide antibiotics, dithizone, antimalarial medications, some receptor H_{2}-antagonists, and cardiovascular agents. The disturbance "is attributed to the chelating action which removes zinc from the tapetal cells."

== See also ==
- Defense mechanism (biology)
- Emission theory (vision)
- Nocturnal bottleneck
- Walleye
