= Nanonet =

Net with fibers on the scale of nanometers

A nanonet is a net with fibers on the scale of nanometers. The net can be composed of carbon, metals, silicon, or peptides, such as nanonets composed of the defensin HD6. The word nanonet is also used in reference to a nanoscale communication network, which also uses key components on the scale of a hundred nanometers as officially defined in IEEE P1906.1.

== See also ==
- IEEE P1906.1 Recommended Practice for Nanoscale and Molecular Communication Framework
