= SMAD3 =

Protein-coding gene in humans

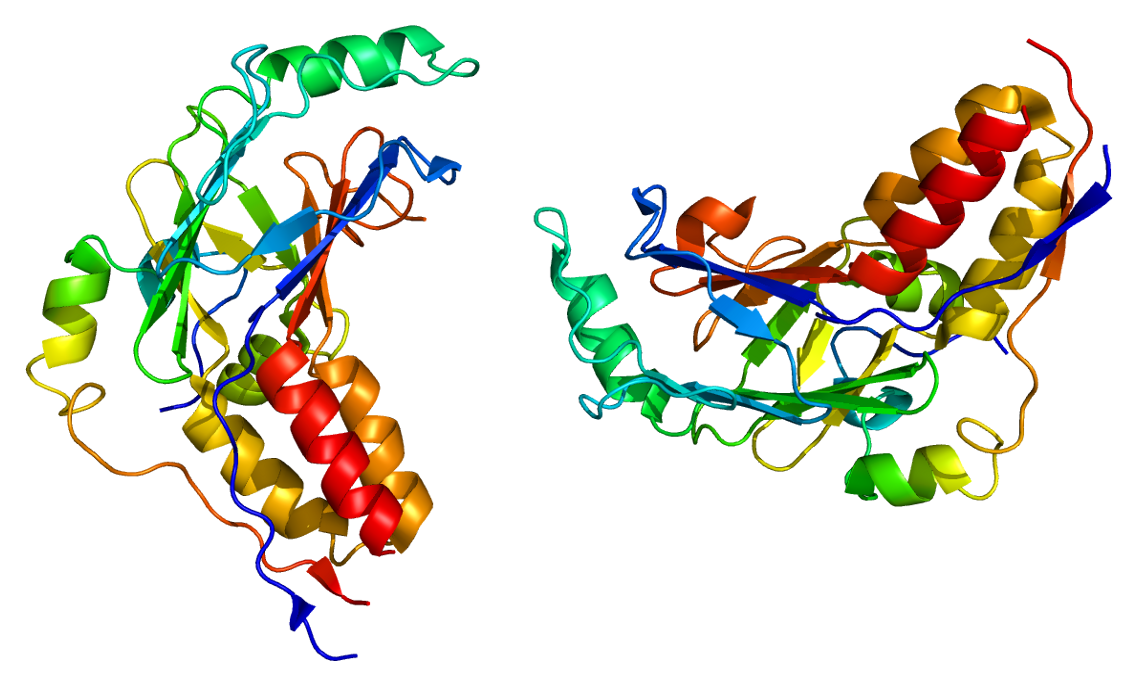

Identifiers
- Aliases: SMAD3, HSPC193, HsT17436, JV15-2, LDS1C, LDS3, MADH3, SMAD family member 3
- External IDs: OMIM: 603109; MGI: 1201674; GeneCards: SMAD3
Available structures
| PDB | Ortholog search: PDBe RCSB |
| PDB | List of PDB id codes 2LB2, 1MHD, 1MJS, 1MK2, 1OZJ, 1U7F, 2LAJ, 5OD6, 5ODG |

Gene location (Human)
| Chr. | Chromosome 15 (human) |
| Band | 15q22.33 | Start | 67,063,763 bp |
| Band | 15q22.33 | End | 67,195,173 bp |

Gene location (Mouse)
| Chr. | Chromosome 9 (mouse) |
| Band | 9|9 C | Start | 63,554,049 bp |
| Band | 9|9 C | End | 63,665,276 bp |
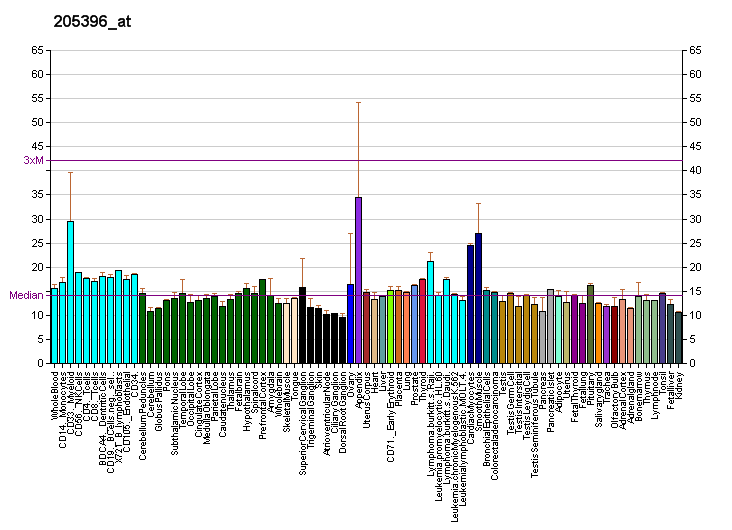

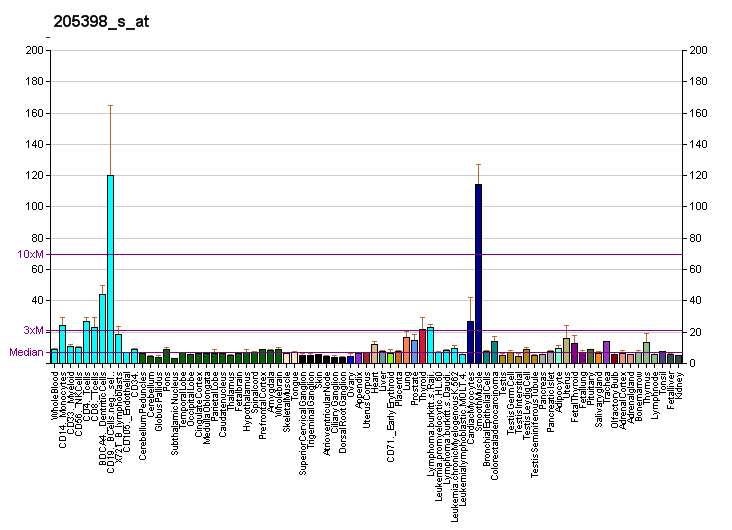

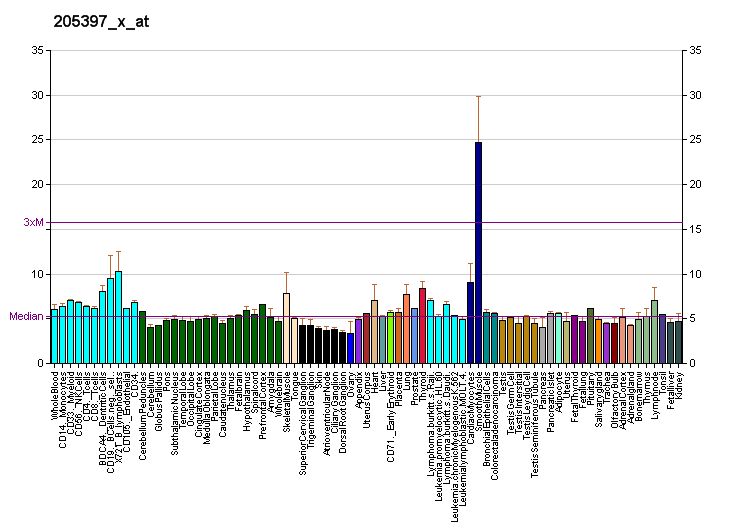
RNA expression pattern
| Bgee | Human / Mouse (ortholog); Top expressed in: tendon of biceps brachii; cartilage tissue; muscle of thigh; mucosa of esophagus; epithelium of colon; gastrocnemius muscle; synovial joint; Skeletal muscle tissue of biceps brachii; mucosa of urinary bladder; olfactory zone of nasal mucosa / Top expressed in: genital tubercle; temporal muscle; triceps brachii muscle; molar; ankle; sternocleidomastoid muscle; tail of embryo; internal carotid artery; external carotid artery; fossa; More reference expression data |
| BioGPS | More reference expression data |
Gene ontology
| Molecular function | phosphatase binding; DNA-binding transcription factor activity; R-SMAD binding; co-SMAD binding; RNA polymerase II transcription regulatory region sequence-specific DNA binding; transcription factor binding; metal ion binding; RNA polymerase II cis-regulatory region sequence-specific DNA binding; enzyme binding; transforming growth factor beta receptor binding; protein homodimerization activity; collagen binding; zinc ion binding; chromatin binding; cis-regulatory region sequence-specific DNA binding; protein binding; double-stranded DNA binding; protein kinase binding; sequence-specific DNA binding; DNA binding; bHLH transcription factor binding; ubiquitin binding; identical protein binding; protein heterodimerization activity; chromatin DNA binding; ubiquitin protein ligase binding; beta-catenin binding; RNA polymerase II general transcription initiation factor activity; DEAD/H-box RNA helicase binding; mineralocorticoid receptor binding; glucocorticoid receptor binding; primary miRNA binding; DNA-binding transcription factor activity, RNA polymerase II-specific; SMAD binding; DNA-binding transcription activator activity, RNA polymerase II-specific; transcription coregulator activity |
| Cellular component | cytoplasm; nucleus; heteromeric SMAD protein complex; SMAD protein complex; transcription regulator complex; receptor complex; plasma membrane; intracellular anatomical structure; nucleoplasm; nuclear inner membrane; cytosol; protein-containing complex |
| Biological process | somitogenesis; skeletal system development; ureteric bud development; endoderm development; regulation of transforming growth factor beta2 production; embryonic pattern specification; regulation of transcription by RNA polymerase II; negative regulation of osteoblast differentiation; heart looping; positive regulation of chondrocyte differentiation; positive regulation of alkaline phosphatase activity; positive regulation of interleukin-1 beta production; pericardium development; regulation of binding; negative regulation of wound healing; activation of cysteine-type endopeptidase activity involved in apoptotic process; transforming growth factor beta receptor signaling pathway; negative regulation of inflammatory response; positive regulation of positive chemotaxis; negative regulation of cell population proliferation; negative regulation of fat cell differentiation; cell-cell junction organization; regulation of transcription, DNA-templated; extrinsic apoptotic signaling pathway; activation of cysteine-type endopeptidase activity involved in apoptotic signaling pathway; signal transduction involved in regulation of gene expression; in utero embryonic development; negative regulation of transforming growth factor beta receptor signaling pathway; nodal signaling pathway; positive regulation of transcription, DNA-templated; negative regulation of cell growth; regulation of immune response; positive regulation of transforming growth factor beta3 production; T cell activation; activin receptor signaling pathway; regulation of striated muscle tissue development; embryonic foregut morphogenesis; positive regulation of bone mineralization; wound healing; negative regulation of apoptotic process; positive regulation of extracellular matrix assembly; negative regulation of transcription by RNA polymerase II; positive regulation of epithelial to mesenchymal transition; mitigation of host defenses by virus; thyroid gland development; developmental growth; lens fiber cell differentiation; gastrulation; immune response; osteoblast differentiation; primary miRNA processing; negative regulation of osteoblast proliferation; osteoblast development; embryonic cranial skeleton morphogenesis; transdifferentiation; paraxial mesoderm morphogenesis; response to hypoxia; positive regulation of cell migration; mesoderm formation; regulation of transforming growth factor beta receptor signaling pathway; positive regulation of gene expression; immune system development; positive regulation of focal adhesion assembly; liver development; regulation of epithelial cell proliferation; positive regulation of stress fiber assembly; positive regulation of transcription by RNA polymerase II; negative regulation of mitotic cell cycle; negative regulation of cytosolic calcium ion concentration; canonical Wnt signaling pathway; protein stabilization; transcription, DNA-templated; negative regulation of protein catabolic process; protein deubiquitination; positive regulation of nitric oxide biosynthetic process; negative regulation of lung blood pressure; positive regulation of pri-miRNA transcription by RNA polymerase II; negative regulation of cardiac muscle hypertrophy in response to stress; cellular response to transforming growth factor beta stimulus; cellular response to cytokine stimulus; positive regulation of protein import into nucleus; positive regulation of DNA-binding transcription factor activity; SMAD protein signal transduction; positive regulation of canonical Wnt signaling pathway; SMAD protein complex assembly; adrenal gland development |
Sources:Amigo / QuickGO
Orthologs
| Databases | NCBI: entry; OMA: entry |
| Species | Human | Mouse |
| Entrez | 4088 | 17127 |
| Ensembl | ENSG00000166949 | ENSMUSG00000032402 |
| UniProt | P84022 | Q8BUN5 |
| RefSeq (mRNA) | NM_001145102; NM_001145103; NM_001145104; NM_005902 | NM_016769 |
| RefSeq (protein) | NP_001138574; NP_001138575; NP_001138576; NP_005893 | NP_058049 |
| Location (UCSC) | Chr 15: 67.06 – 67.2 Mb | Chr 9: 63.55 – 63.67 Mb |
| PubMed search |
- Wikidata
| View/Edit Human | View/Edit Mouse |

Mothers against decapentaplegic homolog 3 also known as SMAD family member 3 or SMAD3 is a protein that in humans is encoded by the SMAD3 gene.

SMAD3 is a member of the SMAD family of proteins. It acts as a mediator of the signals initiated by the transforming growth factor beta (TGF-β) superfamily of cytokines, which regulate cell proliferation, differentiation and death. Based on its essential role in TGF beta signaling pathway, SMAD3 has been related with tumor growth in cancer development.

== Gene ==
The human SMAD3 gene is located on chromosome 15 on the cytogenic band at 15q22.33. The gene is composed of 9 exons over 129,339 base pairs. It is one of several human homologues of a gene that was originally discovered in the fruit fly Drosophila melanogaster.

The expression of SMAD3 has been related to the mitogen-activated protein kinase (MAPK/ERK pathway), particularly to the activity of mitogen-activated protein kinase kinase-1 (MEK1). Studies have demonstrated that inhibition of MEK1 activity also inhibits SMAD3 expression in epithelial cells and smooth muscle cells, two cell types highly responsive to TGF-β1.

== Protein ==
SMAD3 is a polypeptide with a molecular weight of 48,080 Da. It belongs to the SMAD family of proteins. SMAD3 is recruited by SARA (SMAD Anchor for Receptor Activation) to the membrane, where the TGF-β receptor is located. The receptors for TGF-β, (including nodal, activin, myostatin and other family members) are membrane serine/threonine kinases that preferentially phosphorylate and activate SMAD2 and SMAD3.

Once SMAD3 is phosphorylated at the C-terminus, it dissociates from SARA and forms a heterodimeric complex with SMAD4, which is required for the transcriptional regulation of many target genes. The complex of two SMAD3 (or of two SMAD2) and one SMAD4 binds directly to DNA though interactions of the MH1 domain. These complexes are recruited to sites throughout the genome by cell lineage-defining transcription factors (LDTFs) that determine the context-dependent nature of TGF-β action. The DNA binding sites in promoters and enhancers are known as the SMAD-binding elements (SBEs). These sites contain the CAG(AC)|(CC) and GGC(GC)|(CG) consensus sequences, the latter also known as 5GC sites. The 5GC-motifs are highly represented as clusters of sites, in SMAD-bound regions genome-wide. These clusters can also contain CAG(AC)|(CC) sites. SMAD3/SMAD4 complex also binds to the TPA-responsive gene promoter elements, which have the sequence motif TGAGTCAG.

Transcriptional coregulators, such as WWTR1 (TAZ), interact with SMAD3 to promote their function.

== Structure ==
=== MH1 domain ===
The X-ray structures of the SMAD3 MH1 domain bound to the GTCT DNA reveal characteristic features of the fold. The MH1 structure consists of four-helices and three sets of antiparallel β-hairpins, one of which is used to interact with DNA. It also revealed the presence of a bound Zn^{2+}, coordinated by His126, Cys64, Cys109 and Cys121 residues. The main DNA binding region of the MH1 domain comprises the loop following the β1 strand, and the β2-β3 hairpin. In the complex with a member of the 5GC DNAs, the GGCGC motif, the convex face of the DNA-binding hairpin dives into the concave major groove of the duplex DNA containing five base pairs (GGCGC /'GCGCC'). In addition, the three residues strictly conserved in all R-SMADS and in SMAD4 (Arg74 and Gln76 located in β2 and Lys81 in β3 in SMAD3) participate in a network of specific hydrogen bonds with the dsDNA. Several tightly bound water molecules at the protein-DNA interface that contribute to the stabilization of the interactions have also been detected. The SMAD3 complex with the GGCGC site reveals that the protein-DNA interface is highly complementary and that one MH1 protein covers a DNA binding site of six base pairs.

=== MH2 domain ===
The MH2 domain mediates the interaction of R-SMADS with activated TGF-β receptors, and with SMAD4 after receptor-mediated phosphorylation of the Ser-X-Ser motif present in R-SMADS. The MH2 domain is also a binding platform for cytoplasmic anchors, DNA-binding cofactors, histone modifiers, chromatin readers, and nucleosome- positioning factors. The structure of the complex of SMAD3 and SMAD4 MH2 domains has been determined. The MH2 fold is defined by two sets of antiparallel β-strands (six and five strands respectively) arranged as a β-sandwich flanked by a triple-helical bundle on one side and by a set of large loops and a helix on the other.

== Functions and interactions ==
=== TGF-β/SMAD signaling pathway ===
SMAD3 functions as a transcriptional modulator, binding the TRE (TPA responsive element) in the promoter region of many genes that are regulated by TGF-β. SMAD3 and SMAD4 can also form a complex with c-Fos and c-jun at the AP-1/SMAD site to regulate TGF-β-inducible transcription. The genes regulated by SMAD3-mediated TGFβ signaling affect differentiation, growth and death. TGF-β/SMAD signaling pathway has been shown to have a critical role in the expression of genes controlling differentiation of embryonic stem cells. Some of the developmental genes regulated by this pathway include FGF1, NGF, and WNT11 as well as stem/progenitor cell associated genes CD34 and CXCR4. The activity of this pathway as a regulator of pluripotent cell states requires the TRIM33-SMAD2/3 chromatin reading complex.

=== TGF-β/SMAD3-induced repression ===
Besides the activity of TGF-β in the up-regulation of genes, this signaling molecule also induces the repression of target genes containing the TGF-β inhibitory element (TIE). SMAD3 plays also a critical role in TGF-β-induced repression of target genes, specifically it is required for the repression of c-myc. The transcriptional repression of c-myc is dependent on direct SMAD3 binding to a repressive SMAD binding element (RSBE), within TIE of the c-myc promoter. The c-myc TIE is a composite element, composed of an overlapping RSBE and a consensus E2F site, which is capable of binding at least SMAD3, SMAD4, E2F4, and p107.

== Clinical significance ==
=== Diseases ===
Increased SMAD3 activity has been implicated in the pathogenesis of scleroderma.

SMAD3 is also a multifaceted regulator in adipose physiology and the pathogenesis of obesity and type 2 diabetes. SMAD3-knockout mice have diminished adiposity, with improved glucose tolerance and insulin sensitivity. Despite their reduced physical activity arising from muscle atrophy, these SMAD3-knockout mice are resistant to high-fat-diet induced obesity. SMAD3-knockout mouse is a legitimate animal model of human aneurysms‐osteoarthritis syndrome (AOS), also named Loeys-Dietz Syndrome (type 3). SMAD3 deficiency promotes inflammatory aortic aneurysms in angiotensin II-infused mice via the activation of iNOS. Macrophage depletion and inhibition of iNOS activity prevent aortic aneurysms related to SMAD3 gene mutation

=== Role in cancer ===
The role of SMAD3 in the regulation of genes important for cell fate, such as differentiation, growth and death, implies that an alteration in its activity or repressing of its activity can lead to the formation or development of cancer. Also several studies have proven the bifunctional tumor suppressor/oncogene role of TGF beta signaling pathway in carcinogenesis.

One way in which SMAD3 transcriptional activator function is repressed, is by the activity of EVI-1. EVI-1 encodes a zinc-finger protein that may be involved in leukaemic transformation of haematopoietic cells. The zinc-finger domain of EVI-1 interacts with SMAD3, thereby suppressing the transcriptional activity of SMAD3. EVI-1 is thought to be able to promote growth and to block differentiation in some cell types by repressing TGF-β signalling and antagonizing the growth-inhibitory effects of TGF-β.

==== Prostate ====
The activity of SMAD3 in prostate cancer is related with the regulation of angiogenic molecules expression in tumor vascularization and cell-cycle inhibitor in tumor growth. The progressive growth of primary tumors and metastases in prostate cancer depends on an adequate blood supply provided by tumor angiogenesis. Studies analyzing SMAD3 levels of expression in prostate cancer cell lines found that the two androgen-independent and androgen receptor-negative cell lines (PC-3MM2 and DU145) have high expression levels of SMAD3. Analysis of the relation between SMAD3 and the regulation of angiogenic molecules suggest that SMAD3 may be one of key components as a repressor of the critical angiogenesis switch in prostate cancer. The pituitary tumor-transforming gene 1 (PTTG1) has also an impact in SMAD3-mediated TGFβ signaling. PTTG1 has been associated with various cancer cells including prostate cancer cells. Studies showed that the overexpression of PTTG1 induces a decrease in SMAD3 expression, promoting the proliferation of prostate cancer cells via the inhibition of SMAD3.

==== Colorectal ====
In mice, mutation of SMAD3 has been linked to colorectal adenocarcinoma, increased systemic inflammation, and accelerated wound healing. Studies have shown that mutations in SMAD3 gene promote colorectal cancer in mice. The altered activity of SMAD3 was linked to chronic inflammation and somatic mutations that contribute to chronic colitis and the development of colorectal cancer. The results generated on mice helped identify SMAD3 like a possible player in human colorectal cancer. The impact of SMAD3 has also been analyzed in colorectal cancer human cell lines, using single-nucleotide polymorphism (SNP) microarray analysis. The results showed reductions in SMAD3 transcriptional activity and SMAD2-SMAD4 complex formation, underlining the critical roles of these three proteins within the TGF-β signaling pathway and the impact of this pathway in colorectal cancer development.

==== Breast ====
TGF-β-induced SMAD3 transcriptional regulation response has been associated with breast cancer bone metastasis by its effects on tumor angiogenesis, and epithelial-mesenchymal transition (EMT). There have been identified diverse molecules that act over the TGF-β/SMAD signaling pathway, affecting primarily the SMAD2/3 complex, which have been associated with the development of breast cancer.

FOXM1 (forkhead box M1) is a molecule that binds with SMAD3 to sustain activation of the SMAD3/SMAD4 complex in the nucleus. The research over FOXM1 suggested that it prevents the E3 ubiquitin-protein ligase transcriptional intermediary factor 1 γ (TIF1γ) from binding SMAD3 and monoubiquitinating SMAD4, which stabilized the SMAD3/SMAD4 complex. FOXM1 is a key player in the activity of the SMAD3/SMAD4 complex, promoting SMAD3 modulator transcriptional activity, and also plays an important role in the turnover of the activity of SMAD3/SMAD4 complex. Based on the importance of this molecule, studies have found that FOXM1 is overexpressed in highly aggressive human breast cancer tissues. The results from these studies also found that the FOXM1/SMAD3 interaction was required for TGF-β-induced breast cancer invasion, which was the result of SMAD3/SMAD4-dependent upregulation of the transcription factor SLUG.

MED15 is a mediator molecule that promotes the activity of the TGF-β/SMAD signaling. The deficiency of this molecule attenuates the activity of the TGF-β/SMAD signaling pathway over the genes required for induction of epithelial-mesenchymal transition. The action of MED15 is related with the phosphorylation of SMAD2/3 complex. The knockdown of MED15 reduces the amount of SMAD3 phosphorylated, therefore reducing its activity as transcription modulator. However, in cancer, MED15 is also highly expressed in clinical breast cancer tissues correlated with hyperactive TGF-β signaling, as indicated by SMAD3 phosphorylation. The studies suggest that MED15 increases the metastatic potential of a breast cancer cell line by increasing TGF-β-induced epithelial–mesenchymal transition.

==== Kidney ====
Smad3 activation plays a role in the pathogenesis of renal fibrosis, probably by inducing activation of bone marrow-derived fibroblasts.

== Nomenclature ==
The SMAD proteins are homologs of both the Drosophila protein "mothers against decapentaplegic" (MAD) and the C. elegans protein SMA. The name is a combination of the two. During Drosophila research, it was found that a mutation in the gene MAD in the mother repressed the gene decapentaplegic in the embryo. The phrase "Mothers against" was inspired by organizations formed by mothers to oppose social problems, such as Mothers Against Drunk Driving (MADD); and based on a tradition of such unusual naming within the gene research community.

A reference assembly of SMAD3 is available.
