= DEFA6 =

Protein-coding gene in the species Homo sapiens

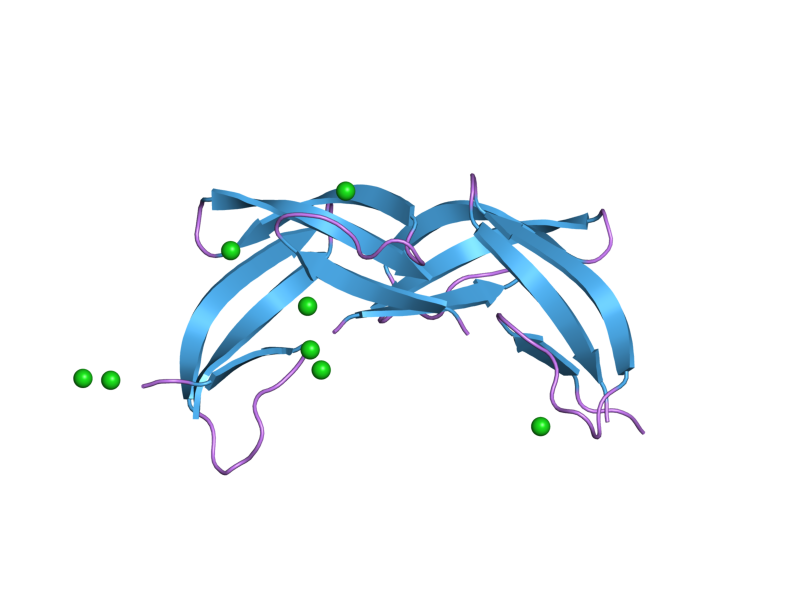

Identifiers
- Aliases: DEFA6, DEF6, HD-6, defensin alpha 6
- External IDs: OMIM: 600471; MGI: 3711900; GeneCards: DEFA6
Available structures
PDB	Ortholog search: PDBe RCSB
PDB	List of PDB id codes 1ZMQ, 3QTE

Gene location (Human)
Chr.	Chromosome 8 (human)
Band	8p23.1	Start	6,924,697 bp
Band	8p23.1	End	6,926,076 bp

Gene location (Mouse)
Chr.	Chromosome 8 (mouse)
Band	8 A2|8	Start	21,555,054 bp
Band	8 A2|8	End	21,556,012 bp
RNA expression pattern
Bgee	Human / Mouse (ortholog); Top expressed in: duodenum; rectum; mucosa of transverse colon; appendix; lymph node; body of pancreas; skin of abdomen; bone marrow; right lung; gastric mucosa / Top expressed in: ileum; jejunum; duodenum; embryo; colon; pancreas; thymus; esophagus; liver; stomach; More reference expression data
BioGPS	n/a
Gene ontology
Molecular function	protein binding; protein homodimerization activity
Cellular component	Golgi lumen; extracellular region; extracellular space
Biological process	defense response; defense response to bacterium; defense response to fungus; antimicrobial humoral response; antimicrobial humoral immune response mediated by antimicrobial peptide; killing of cells of other organism; innate immune response in mucosa; antibacterial humoral response; defense response to Gram-negative bacterium; defense response to Gram-positive bacterium; membrane disruption in other organism; cellular response to lipopolysaccharide
Sources:Amigo / QuickGO
Orthologs
Databases	NCBI: entry; OMA: entry
Species	Human	Mouse
Entrez	1671	100041688
Ensembl	ENSG00000164822; ENSG00000285136	ENSMUSG00000061845
UniProt	Q01524	E9QLQ1
RefSeq (mRNA)	NM_001926	NM_001177481
RefSeq (protein)	NP_001917	NP_001170952
Location (UCSC)	Chr 8: 6.92 – 6.93 Mb	Chr 8: 21.56 – 21.56 Mb
PubMed search
- Wikidata
View/Edit Human	View/Edit Mouse

Defensin, alpha 6 (DEFA6) also known as human alpha defensin 6 (HD6) is a human protein that is encoded by the DEFA6 gene. DEFA6 is expressed in the Paneth cells of the ileum.

== Function ==
The alpha defensins are a family of microbicidal and cytotoxic peptides that defend the host against bacteria and viruses. HD6 has poor antibacterial potency. However, HD6 affords protection against invasion by enteric bacterial pathogens by self-assembly to form fibrils and nanonets that surround and entangle bacteria.

Several alpha defensin genes, including DEFA6, are clustered on chromosome 8.
