= Dithizone =

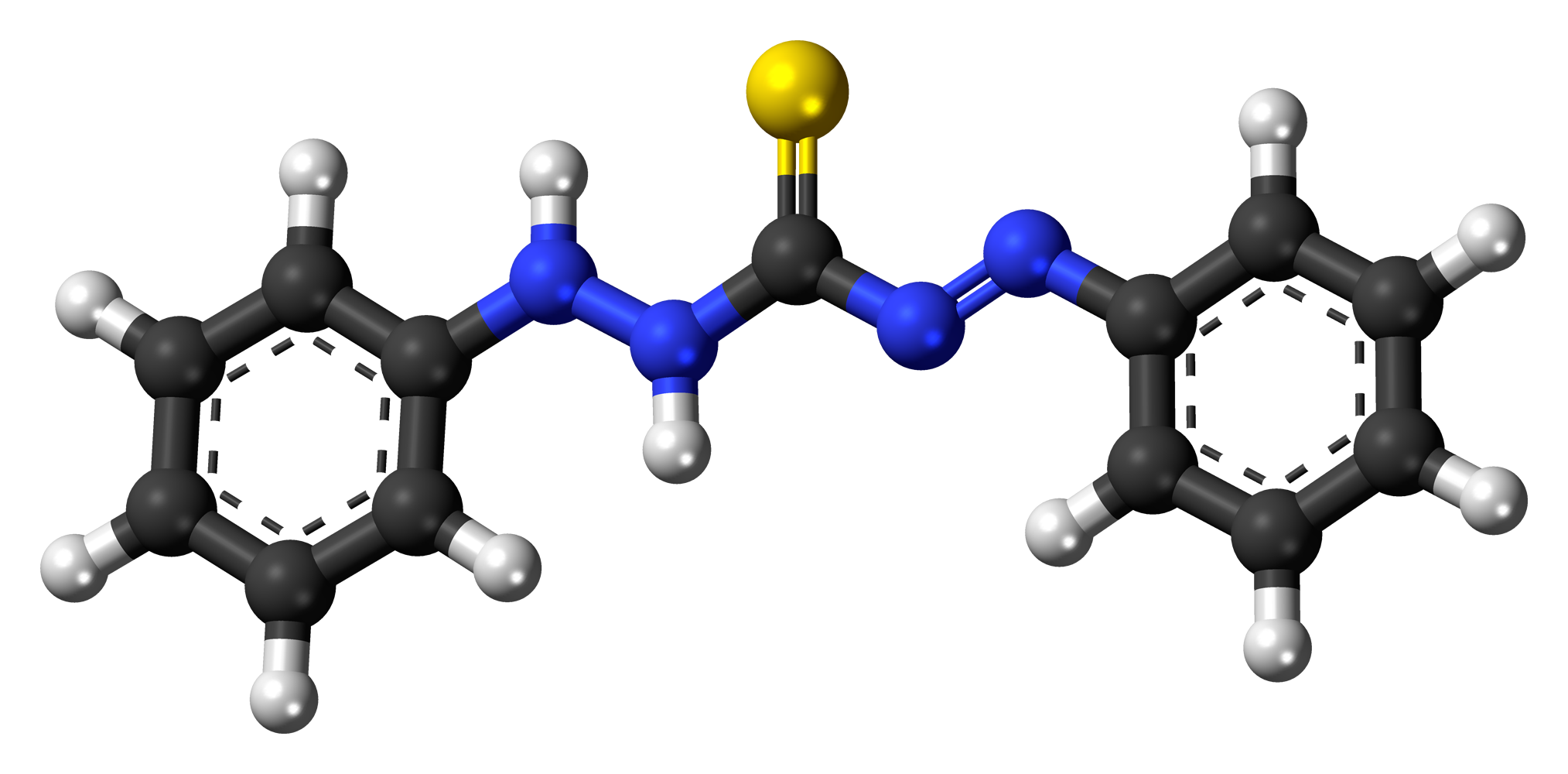

Names
- IUPAC name (1E)-3-anilino-1-phenylimino-thiourea
- Other names Diphenylthiocarbazone, 1,5-Diphenylthiocarbazone

Identifiers
CAS Number	60-10-6
3D model (JSmol)	Interactive image
ChemSpider	571406
ECHA InfoCard	100.000.413
PubChem CID	657262
UNII	NJZ2CJ4D6P
CompTox Dashboard (EPA)	DTXSID0058770
- InChI: InChI=1S/C13H12N4S/c18-13(16-14-11-7-3-1-4-8-11)17-15-12-9-5-2-6-10-12/h1-10,14H,(H,16,18)/b17-15+ Key: UOFGSWVZMUXXIY-BMRADRMJSA-N; InChI=1/C13H12N4S/c18-13(16-14-11-7-3-1-4-8-11)17-15-12-9-5-2-6-10-12/h1-10,14H,(H,16,18)/b17-15+ Key: UOFGSWVZMUXXIY-BMRADRMJBA
- SMILES: S=C(/N=N/c1ccccc1)NNc2ccccc2

Properties
Chemical formula	C_{13}H_{12}N_{4}S
Molar mass	256.33 g·mol^{−1}
Melting point	165 to 169 °C (329 to 336 °F; 438 to 442 K)

Hazards
Safety data sheet (SDS)	External MSDS
- Except where otherwise noted, data are given for materials in their standard state (at 25 °C [77 °F], 100 kPa). verify (what is ?) Infobox references

Dithizone is a sulfur-containing organic compound. It is a good ligand, and forms complexes with many toxic metals such as lead, thallium and mercury.

Dithizone may be prepared by reacting phenylhydrazine with carbon disulfide, followed by reaction with potassium hydroxide.

Dithizone is used to assess the purity of human pancreatic islet preparations used for transplantation into patients with type 1 diabetes. Dithizone binds zinc ions present in the islet's beta cells, and therefore stains the islets red. Exocrine tissue also present in the preparations does not bind dithizone, and is therefore not stained.

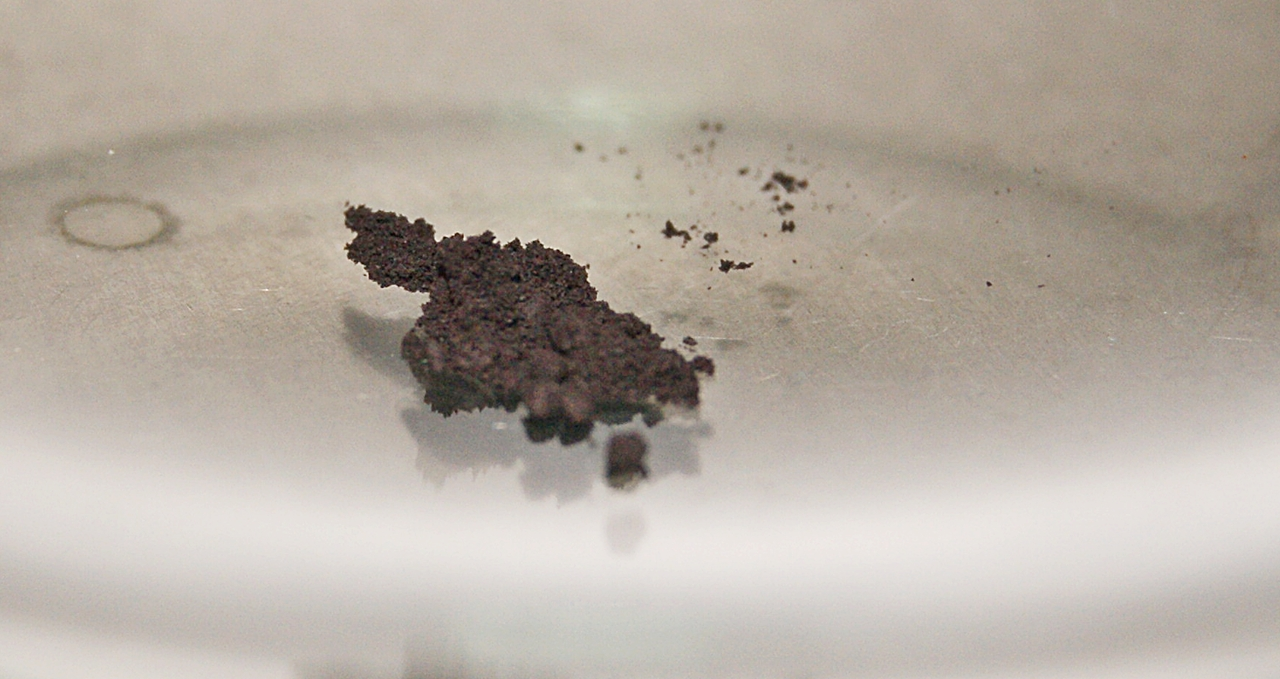
Dithizone

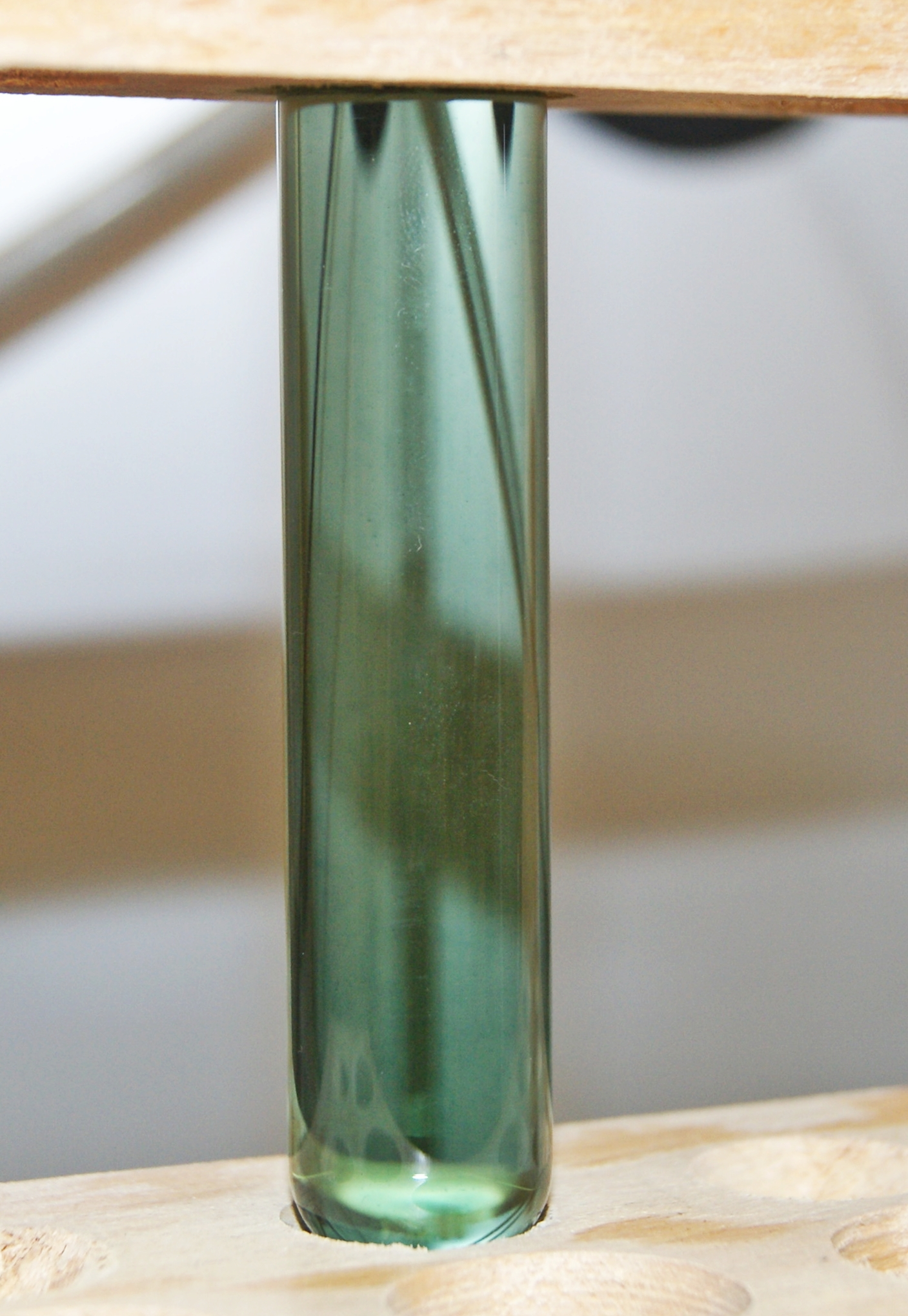
Dithizone in Ethanol 96%
