= DEFA4 =

Protein-coding gene in the species Homo sapiens

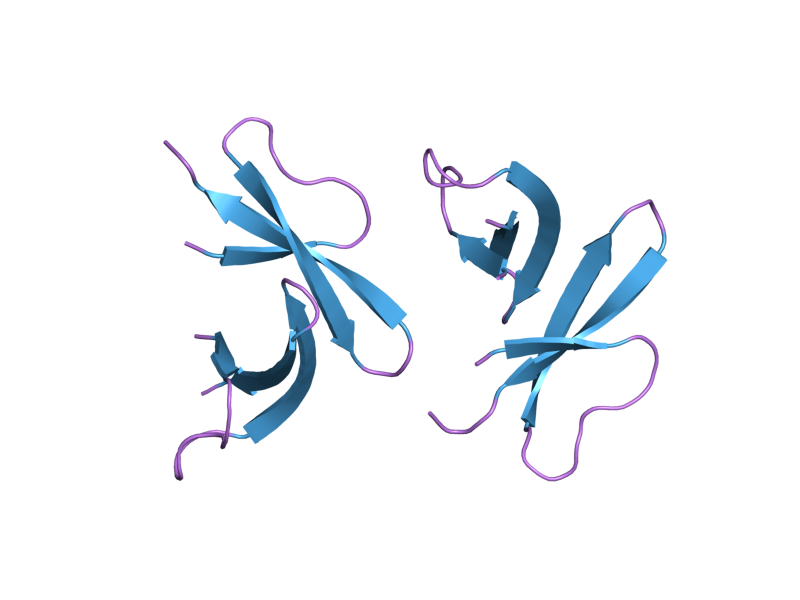

Identifiers
- Aliases: DEFA4, DEF4, HNP-4, HP-4, HP4, defensin alpha 4
- External IDs: OMIM: 601157; MGI: 3711900; GeneCards: DEFA4
Available structures
PDB	Ortholog search: PDBe RCSB
PDB	List of PDB id codes 1ZMM

Gene location (Human)
Chr.	Chromosome 8 (human)
Band	8p23.1	Start	6,935,820 bp
Band	8p23.1	End	6,938,306 bp

Gene location (Mouse)
Chr.	Chromosome 8 (mouse)
Band	8 A2|8	Start	21,555,054 bp
Band	8 A2|8	End	21,556,012 bp
RNA expression pattern
Bgee	Human / Mouse (ortholog); Top expressed in: bone marrow; bone marrow cell; monocyte; blood; granulocyte; spleen; right lung; upper lobe of left lung; placenta; right lobe of liver / Top expressed in: ileum; jejunum; duodenum; embryo; colon; pancreas; thymus; esophagus; liver; stomach; More reference expression data
BioGPS	n/a
Gene ontology
Molecular function	protein homodimerization activity
Cellular component	Golgi lumen; extracellular region; azurophil granule; extracellular space; specific granule lumen
Biological process	defense response; defense response to bacterium; neutrophil degranulation; innate immune response; antimicrobial humoral immune response mediated by antimicrobial peptide; T cell chemotaxis; antimicrobial humoral response; killing of cells of other organism; defense response to fungus; innate immune response in mucosa; antibacterial humoral response; defense response to Gram-negative bacterium; defense response to Gram-positive bacterium; membrane disruption in other organism; cellular response to lipopolysaccharide
Sources:Amigo / QuickGO
Orthologs
Databases	NCBI: entry; OMA: entry
Species	Human	Mouse
Entrez	1669	100041688
Ensembl	ENSG00000164821; ENSG00000285318	ENSMUSG00000061845
UniProt	P12838	E9QLQ1
RefSeq (mRNA)	NM_001925	NM_001177481
RefSeq (protein)	NP_001916	NP_001170952
Location (UCSC)	Chr 8: 6.94 – 6.94 Mb	Chr 8: 21.56 – 21.56 Mb
PubMed search
- Wikidata
View/Edit Human	View/Edit Mouse

Defensin, alpha 4 (DEFA4), also known as neutrophil defensin 4 or HNP4, is a human defensin peptide that is encoded by the DEFA4 gene. HNP4 is expressed in the granules of the neutrophil where it defends the host against bacteria and viruses.

== Function ==
Defensins are a peptide family of cytotoxic microbicides involved in innate immunity. Members of the defensin family are distinguished by a conserved six-cysteine motif. Several human alpha defensin genes including HNP4 are clustered on chromosome 8. DEFA4 differs from other defensin genes by an extra 83-base segment that is apparently the result of a recent duplication within the coding region. HNP4 inhibits corticotropin-stimulated corticosterone production.
