= DEFA5 =

Mammalian protein found in Homo sapiens

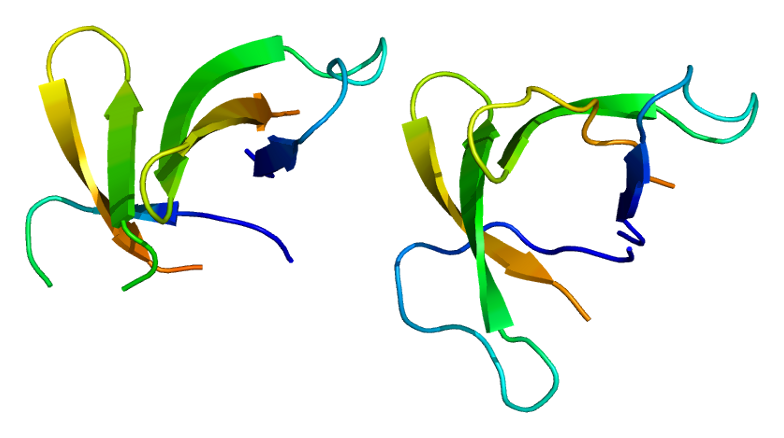

Identifiers
- Aliases: DEFA5, DEF5, HD-5, defensin alpha 5, alpha defensin 5
- External IDs: OMIM: 600472; MGI: 3711900; GeneCards: DEFA5
Available structures
PDB	Ortholog search: PDBe RCSB
PDB	List of PDB id codes 1ZMP, 2LXZ, 2MIT, 3I5W, 4E82, 4E83, 4E86, 4RBW, 4RBX, 5CUM, 5CUJ, 5CUI

Gene location (Human)
Chr.	Chromosome 8 (human)
Band	8p23.1	Start	7,055,304 bp
Band	8p23.1	End	7,056,739 bp

Gene location (Mouse)
Chr.	Chromosome 8 (mouse)
Band	8 A2|8	Start	21,555,054 bp
Band	8 A2|8	End	21,556,012 bp
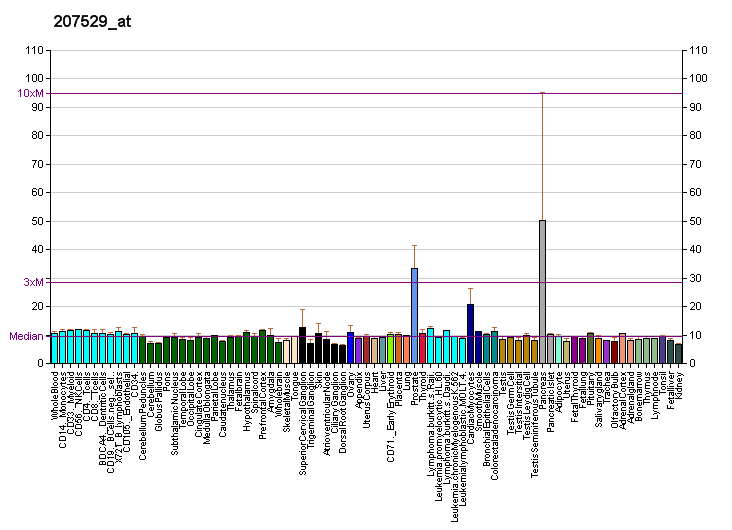
RNA expression pattern
Bgee	Human / Mouse (ortholog); Top expressed in: duodenum; gonad; testicle; appendix; gastric mucosa; right lung; transverse colon; lymph node; rectum; blood / Top expressed in: ileum; jejunum; duodenum; embryo; colon; pancreas; thymus; esophagus; liver; stomach; More reference expression data
BioGPS	More reference expression data
Gene ontology
Molecular function	protein homodimerization activity
Cellular component	Golgi lumen; secretory granule lumen; transport vesicle; cytoplasmic vesicle; extracellular region; extracellular space
Biological process	defense response; defense response to bacterium; defense response to fungus; antimicrobial humoral response; antimicrobial humoral immune response mediated by antimicrobial peptide; innate immune response; positive regulation of membrane permeability; killing of cells of other organism; innate immune response in mucosa; antibacterial humoral response; defense response to Gram-negative bacterium; defense response to Gram-positive bacterium; membrane disruption in other organism; cellular response to lipopolysaccharide
Sources:Amigo / QuickGO
Orthologs
Databases	NCBI: entry; OMA: entry
Species	Human	Mouse
Entrez	1670	100041688
Ensembl	ENSG00000164816; ENSG00000285251	ENSMUSG00000061845
UniProt	Q01523	E9QLQ1
RefSeq (mRNA)	NM_021010	NM_001177481
RefSeq (protein)	NP_066290	NP_001170952
Location (UCSC)	Chr 8: 7.06 – 7.06 Mb	Chr 8: 21.56 – 21.56 Mb
PubMed search
- Wikidata
View/Edit Human	View/Edit Mouse

Defensin, alpha 5 (DEFA5) also known as human alpha defensin 5 (HD5) is a protein that in humans is encoded by the DEFA5 gene. DEFA5 is expressed in the Paneth cells of the ileum.

Defensins are a family of microbicidal and cytotoxic peptides (antimicrobial peptides; AMP) that are involved in host defense, and help to maintain homeostasis of intestinal microbiota. DEFA5 is the main AMP that controls the enteric microbiota composition by selective killing of bacterial pathogens while preserving commensals.

== Structure ==
Defensins are small cationic peptides linked via three intra-molecular disulfide bridges, and contain six intra-molecular cysteine residues which form an unalterable and specific pattern of disulfide bridges which protects them from proteolysis and maintains function in the intestinal lumen. Members of the defensin family are highly similar in protein sequence and distinguished by a conserved cysteine motif.

== Gene and tissue distribution ==
Several of the human alpha defensin genes appear to be clustered on chromosome 8. The protein encoded by this gene, α-defensin-5, is highly expressed in the secretory granules of Paneth cells of the ileum.

== Function ==
In addition to antimicrobial activity, inactivation and neutralization of several bacterial toxins, especially an inhibitory potency against Clostridioides difficile toxins were reported. α-defensin-5 is able to inhibit all three C. difficile toxins A (TcdA), B (TcdB) and CDT in the concentration-dependent manner, and inhibitory mechanism is different for each of them. TcdA and TcdB are inhibited by co-precipitation with DEFA5, and CDT is inhibited by the inactivation of the CDTb pore. In addition to toxin neutralization, DEFA5 is capable to directly kill C. difficile cells by damaging the bacterial wall.
