= DEFA1 =

Protein-coding gene in the species Homo sapiens

Identifiers
- Aliases: DEFA1, DEF1, DEFA2, HNP-1, HP-1, HP1, MRS, defensin alpha 1
- External IDs: OMIM: 125220; GeneCards: DEFA1
Available structures
PDB	Human UniProt search: PDBe RCSB
PDB	List of PDB id codes 2KHT, 2PM1, 3GNY, 3H6C, 3HJ2, 3HJD, 3LO1, 3LO2, 3LO4, 3LO6, 3LO9, 3LOE, 3LVX, 4DU0, 4LB1, 4LB7, 4LBB, 4LBF

Gene location (Human)
Chr.	Chromosome 8 (human)
Band	8p23.1	Start	6,977,649 bp
Band	8p23.1	End	6,980,092 bp
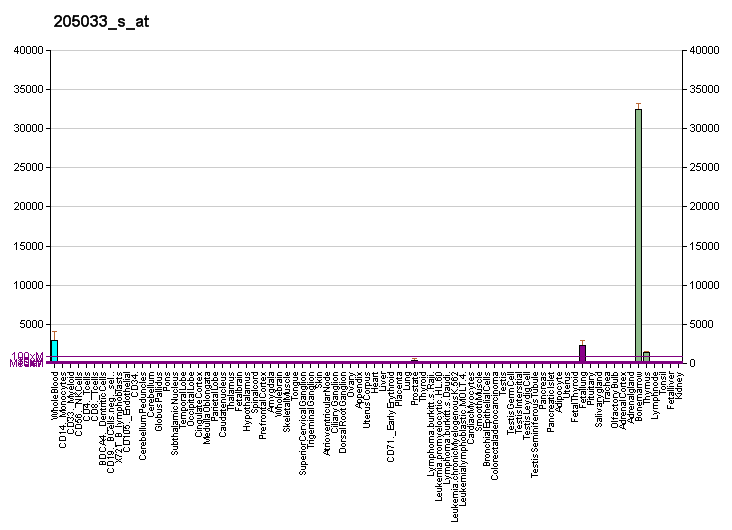
RNA expression pattern
Bgee	Human / Mouse (ortholog); Top expressed in: right lung; granulocyte; monocyte; blood; bone marrow; spleen; bone marrow cell; upper lobe of left lung; Descending thoracic aorta; placenta / n/a; More reference expression data
BioGPS	More reference expression data
Orthologs
Databases	NCBI: entry; OMA: entry
Species	Human	Mouse
Entrez	1667	n/a
Ensembl	ENSG00000206047; ENSG00000284983	n/a
UniProt	P59665	n/a
RefSeq (mRNA)	NM_004084	n/a
RefSeq (protein)	NP_001035965; NP_001289194	n/a
Location (UCSC)	Chr 8: 6.98 – 6.98 Mb	n/a
PubMed search		n/a
- Wikidata
View/Edit Human

Defensin, alpha 1 also known as human alpha defensin 1, human neutrophil peptide 1 (HNP-1) or neutrophil defensin 1 is a human protein that is encoded by the DEFA1 gene. Human alpha defensin 1 belongs to the alpha defensin family of antimicrobial peptides.

== Function ==
Defensins are a family of microbicidal and cytotoxic peptides thought to be involved in host defense. They are abundant in the granules of neutrophils and also found in the epithelia of mucosal surfaces such as those of the intestine, respiratory tract, urinary tract, and vagina. Members of the defensin family are highly similar in protein sequence and distinguished by a conserved cysteine motif. Several alpha defensin genes are clustered on chromosome 8. The protein encoded by this gene, defensin, alpha 1, is found in the microbicidal granules of neutrophils and likely plays a role in phagocyte-mediated host defense. It differs from the defensins, alpha 2 and alpha 3 by only one amino acid.

== Biosynthesis ==
HNPs are generated as 94 amino acids preproHNPs, which are co-translationally cleaved to 75 amino acids pro-peptides with a N-terminal prosegment having a negative charge that neutralizes the highly positively charged C terminal peptide. Processing of proHNPs occurs mainly in late promyelocytes, where the 75 amino acids proHNPs are cleaved to a 56 amino acids intermediate form and onward to 29-30 amino acids mature peptides designated HNPs. Cationic 29-30 amino acids HNPs associate with the negatively charged proteoglycan serglycin and translocate to azurophil granules. At later stages of granulocytic differentiation in which HNP expression peaks (i.e. myelocytes and metamyelocytes), proHNPs are not cleaved, rendering the peptides overall neutral. This prevents binding to serglycin and most proHNP is accordingly secreted into the bone marrow plasma although some is retained in specific granules.
