= WNT11 =

Protein-coding gene in the species Homo sapiens

Identifiers
- Aliases: WNT11, HWnt family member 11
- External IDs: OMIM: 603699; MGI: 101948; GeneCards: WNT11

Gene location (Human)
Chr.	Chromosome 11 (human)
Band	11q13.5	Start	76,186,325 bp
Band	11q13.5	End	76,210,736 bp

Gene location (Mouse)
Chr.	Chromosome 7 (mouse)
Band	7 E1|7 53.9 cM	Start	98,484,319 bp
Band	7 E1|7 53.9 cM	End	98,504,402 bp
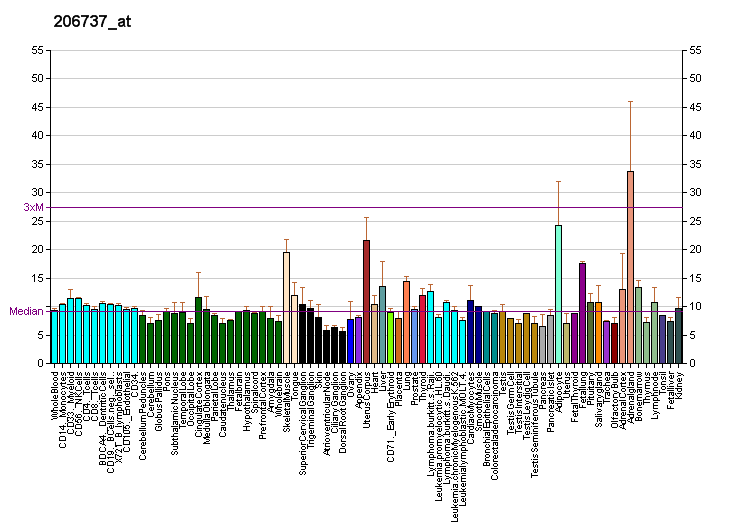
RNA expression pattern
Bgee	Human / Mouse (ortholog); Top expressed in: muscle of thigh; subcutaneous adipose tissue; right adrenal cortex; left adrenal cortex; testicle; right lobe of thyroid gland; apex of heart; gastrocnemius muscle; left lobe of thyroid gland; tendon / Top expressed in: lip; muscle layer of urethra; mucous cell of stomach; muscle layer of ejaculatory duct; muscle of thigh; muscle layer of seminal vesicle; pyloric antrum; external carotid artery; hair; right ventricle; More reference expression data
BioGPS	More reference expression data
Gene ontology
Molecular function	GTPase activator activity; frizzled binding; protein kinase activator activity; protein binding; signaling receptor binding
Cellular component	extracellular region; extracellular space; cytoplasm; extracellular matrix
Biological process	ureteric bud morphogenesis; cellular response to retinoic acid; bone mineralization; cell differentiation; non-canonical Wnt signaling pathway; cell fate commitment; negative regulation of cartilage development; paraxial mesoderm formation; mesonephric duct development; convergent extension involved in axis elongation; positive regulation of protein kinase C signaling; kidney development; positive regulation of cell migration; ventricular septum morphogenesis; outflow tract morphogenesis; negative regulation of apoptotic process; negative regulation of cell death; adrenal gland development; planar cell polarity pathway involved in axis elongation; positive regulation of transforming growth factor beta2 production; somite development; embryonic skeletal system development; positive regulation of transcription, DNA-templated; multicellular organism development; protein phosphorylation; positive regulation of GTPase activity; maintenance of epithelial cell apical/basal polarity; positive regulation of gene expression; Wnt signaling pathway, calcium modulating pathway; negative regulation of cell migration; response to nutrient levels; protein localization to cell surface; notochord morphogenesis; negative regulation of cell growth; osteoblast differentiation; neuron differentiation; artery morphogenesis; bicellular tight junction assembly; epithelial to mesenchymal transition; positive regulation of apoptotic process; canonical Wnt signaling pathway; lung-associated mesenchyme development; negative regulation of transcription, DNA-templated; cloacal septation; negative regulation of mesenchymal cell proliferation; neuroendocrine cell differentiation; negative regulation of canonical Wnt signaling pathway; negative regulation of fibroblast growth factor production; positive regulation of stress fiber assembly; planar cell polarity pathway involved in gastrula mediolateral intercalation; Wnt signaling pathway, planar cell polarity pathway; Wnt signaling pathway; activation of protein kinase activity; cellular response to mechanical stimulus; roof of mouth development; secondary palate development
Sources:Amigo / QuickGO
Orthologs
Databases	NCBI: entry; OMA: entry
Species	Human	Mouse
Entrez	7481	22411
Ensembl	ENSG00000085741	ENSMUSG00000015957
UniProt	O96014	P48615
RefSeq (mRNA)	NM_004626	NM_001285792; NM_001285794; NM_001285795; NM_009519
RefSeq (protein)	NP_004617	NP_001272721; NP_001272723; NP_001272724; NP_033545
Location (UCSC)	Chr 11: 76.19 – 76.21 Mb	Chr 7: 98.48 – 98.5 Mb
PubMed search
- Wikidata
View/Edit Human	View/Edit Mouse

Protein Wnt-11 is a protein that in humans is encoded by the WNT11 gene.

The WNT gene family consists of structurally related genes that encode secreted signaling proteins. These proteins have been implicated in oncogenesis and in several developmental processes, including regulation of cell fate and patterning during embryogenesis. This gene is a member of the WNT gene family. It encodes a protein showing 97%, 85%, and 63% amino acid identity with mouse, chicken, and Xenopus Wnt11 protein, respectively. This gene plays roles in the development of bones, kidneys, and lungs, and is associated with early onset osteoporosis.
