= Defensin beta 4A =

Mammalian protein found in humans

DEFB4A
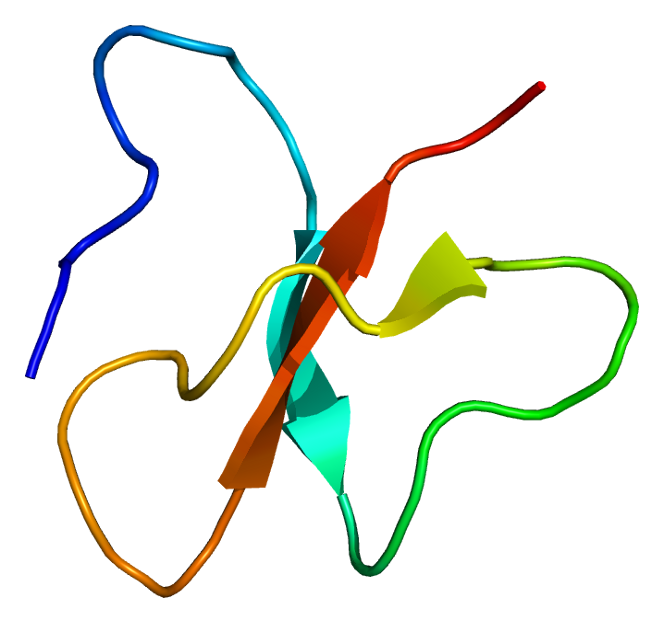

Identifiers
- Aliases: DEFB4A, BD-2, DEFB-2, DEFB102, DEFB2, DEFB4, HBD-2, SAP1, Beta-defensin 2, defensin beta 4A
- External IDs: OMIM: 602215; GeneCards: DEFB4A
Available structures
PDB	Human UniProt search: PDBe RCSB
PDB	List of PDB id codes 1E4Q, 1FD3, 1FD4, 1FQQ

Gene location (Human)
Chr.	Chromosome 8 (human)
Band	8p23.1	Start	7,894,677 bp
Band	8p23.1	End	7,896,716 bp
RNA expression pattern
Bgee	Human / Mouse (ortholog); Top expressed in: gastric mucosa; mucosa of esophagus; gallbladder; tonsil; vagina; upper lobe of left lung; appendix; minor salivary glands; islet of Langerhans; body of stomach / n/a; More reference expression data
BioGPS	n/a
Gene ontology
Molecular function	protein binding; CCR6 chemokine receptor binding; chemoattractant activity
Cellular component	Golgi lumen; extracellular region; extracellular space; intracellular anatomical structure
Biological process	G protein-coupled receptor signaling pathway; defense response; immune response; chemotaxis; defense response to Gram-negative bacterium; defense response to bacterium; defense response to Gram-positive bacterium; antimicrobial humoral response; antimicrobial humoral immune response mediated by antimicrobial peptide; positive chemotaxis; cell chemotaxis
Sources:Amigo / QuickGO
Orthologs
Databases	NCBI: entry; OMA: entry
Species	Human	Mouse
Entrez	1673	n/a
Ensembl	ENSG00000285181; ENSG00000171711	n/a
UniProt	O15263	n/a
RefSeq (mRNA)	NM_004942	n/a
RefSeq (protein)	NP_001192195; NP_004933	n/a
Location (UCSC)	Chr 8: 7.89 – 7.9 Mb	n/a
PubMed search		n/a
- Wikidata
View/Edit Human

Defensin beta 4A, also commonly known as beta-defensin 2 (BD-2), is a peptide that in humans is encoded by the gene DEFB4A (previously DEFB4 or DEFB2). The nearby gene, DEFB4B (previously DEFB4P), encodes an identical protein in the human reference genome (GRCh38). Defensin beta 4A has been referred to by various other names, including skin-antimicrobial peptide 1 (SAP1) and defensin, beta 4.

Human Defensin beta 4A is a cysteine-rich cationic low molecular weight antimicrobial peptide discovered in lesional skin.

== Structure ==
The DEFB4A protein has a primary structure is made by 64 amino acids. At concentrations ≤2.4 mM, DEFB4A is monomeric. The structure is amphiphilic with a nonuniform surface distribution of positive charge and contains several key structural elements, including a triple-stranded, antiparallel beta sheet with strands 2 and 3 in a beta hairpin conformation. The determination of other structural elements depends on the technique used. When X-ray crystallography is used an alpha helix can be observed at the N-terminal end of the protein (PDB codes: 1fd3,1fd4, and 6cs9). When using NMR this alpha-helix does not appear (PDB code: 1e4q), however this structure was determined using a truncated version of DEFB4A which was missing the initial 4 amino acids, and may be the reason for the discrepancy.

== Gene duplicates ==
In humans, DEFB4A and a collection of related genes (DEFB103A, DEFB104A, DEFB105A, DEFB106A, DEFB107A, and SPAG11A) are located on a frequently duplicated region of chromosome 8. Due to this, individuals typically have between 2 and 7 diploid copies of defensin beta 4-coding genes. A slight majority (56%) of alleles have 2 copies, resulting in a mode of about 40% of people having a combined 4 diploid copies. Similar polymorphic duplications are also seen in certain alpha defensin genes and in other species.

== Function ==
Defensins form a family of microbicidal and cytotoxic peptides made by neutrophils. Members of the defensin family are highly similar in protein sequence. DEFB4A is an antibiotic peptide which is locally regulated by inflammation.

Human defensin beta 4A is produced by a number of epithelial cells and exhibits potent antimicrobial activity against Gram-negative bacteria and Candida, but not Gram-positive S. aureus. It has been speculated that DEFB4A may contribute to the infrequency of Gram-negative infections on skin and lung tissue.

Defensin beta 4A represents the first human defensin that is produced following stimulation of epithelial cells by contact with microorganisms such as P. aeruginosa or cytokines such as TNF-alpha and IL-1 beta. The DEFB4A gene and protein are locally expressed in keratinocytes associated with inflammatory skin lesions. It is intriguing to speculate that DEFB4A is a dynamic component of the local epithelial defense system of the skin and respiratory tract having a role to protect surfaces from infection, and providing a possible reason why skin and lung infections with Gram-negative bacteria are rather rare.

Although this protein doesn’t have any antibacterial activity against Gram-positive bacteria, there is a study showing that there is a synergy between DEFB4A and other proteins. One example of this synergistic effect is with epiP, a protein segregated by some strains of S. epidermidis. DEFB4A, holding hands with epiP, is capable of killing S. aureus, a Gram-positive bacteria responsible of human diseases.
