= Labrador Retriever coat colour genetics =

Genetics behind Labrador Retriever coat colour

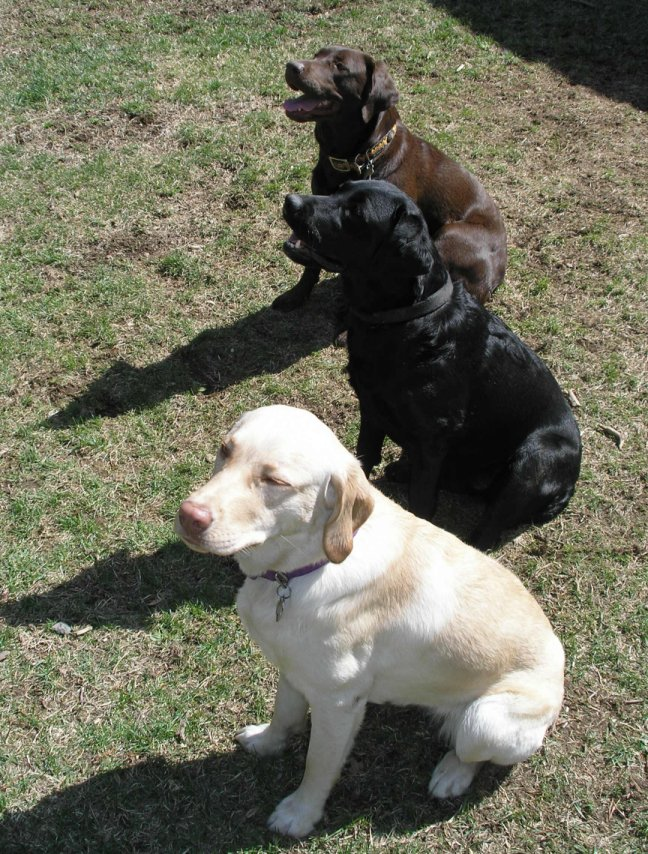
The three recognised colours of Labrador Retriever (top to bottom): chocolate, black and yellow.

The genetic basis of coat colour in the Labrador Retriever has been found to depend on several distinct genes. The interplay among these genes is used as an example of epistasis.

== Background ==
Labrador Retrievers are a popular dog breed in many countries. There are three recognised colours, black, chocolate, and yellow, that result from the interplay among genes that direct production and expression of two pigments, eumelanin (brown or black pigment) and pheomelanin (yellow to red pigment), in the fur and skin of the dog. The recognized colours are due to two genes, while a third gene affects the range of colouration observed within the yellow Labrador. These individual genes do not act independently of each other, and their interaction in affecting the trait of coat colour is used by biology textbooks to demonstrate the genetic principle of epistasis, where multiple genes react synergistically to affect a single trait.

The genetics of mammalian colouration has been studied in detail, and similar mechanisms have been identified across many species. For this reason, much of the early work on the colouration of dogs in general and Labradors in particular have relied heavily on analogy to the traits characterized in mice and other mammals. Initial genetic studies of coat colour in dogs published in the 1950s concluded that there were two main genes involved, one distinguishing blacks from browns, and the other distinguishing blacks from reds and yellows. A 1977 study using crosses within a population of purebred Labradors showed the involvement of two specific genes in production of the three main coat colours of Labradors and described the underlying genetics of these colour varieties.

== Genes for black, chocolate, and yellow colouration ==
=== Pheomelanin in yellow Labradors ===
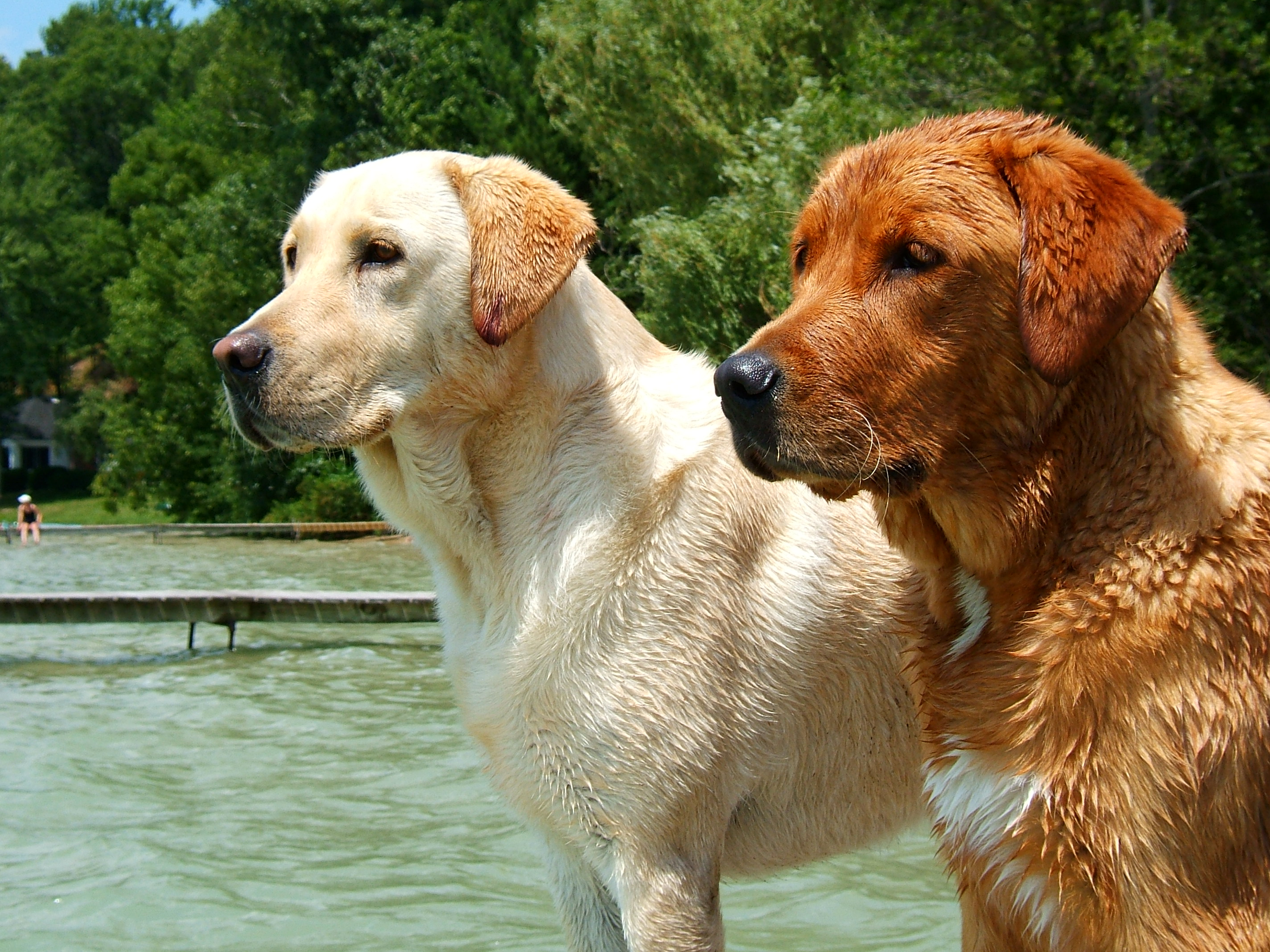
Colour variation within yellow Labradors due to differences in pheomelanin expression - July, 2007

According to Candille, et al. (2007), dog coat color can largely be explained by three genes: MC1R, Agouti and CBD103. When a dog has wild-type alleles at all three genes, it will have a yellow coat. When the dog has a loss-of-function allele at MC1R, it will have a yellow coat regardless of the genes it carries on the other two genes. Only a dominant black allele at CBD103 will produce a black coat color in dogs possessing wild-type alleles at MC1R and Agouti.

The E locus also determines whether the phenotype due to the third genetic locus affecting coat colour will be evident. This locus is recognised as affecting coat colour through the expression of pheomelanin, the pigment responsible for red and yellow pigmentation. The effects on pheomelanin pigmentation are only seen if there is no eumelanin expressed in the fur, else the dark eumelanin will mask any pheomelanin present. Thus these differences are visible only in yellow Labradors, which as a result range in colour from light cream to copper-red.

It had long been thought that the genetic locus for this trait was the same seen regulating pheomelanin in other mammals, subsequently identified as tyrosinase. This enzyme makes both eumelanin and pheomelanin, and when subject to a knockout mutation results in albinism. A less extreme mutation of the same tyrosinase gene, the so-called Chinchilla trait, produces a dilution that selectively affects pheomelanin alone, similar to the phenotype observed in yellow Labradors. Thus, as with Chinchilla-related pheomelanin dilution in other species, this trait in yellow Labradors has been represented by the letter C. However, genetic analysis of the inheritance of coat colour in yellow Labradors has shown that the locus responsible is entirely distinct from the Chinchilla trait of the tyrosinase gene, and likewise is distinct from SLC45A2, the so-called cream gene responsible for the dilution of pheomelanin in buckskin, palomino and cremello horses and also for the absence of pheomelanin in the white tiger, while a mutation in SLC7A11 found to cause pheomelanin dilution in mice was not found in a survey of cream-coloured dogs.

=== Eumelanin colour ===
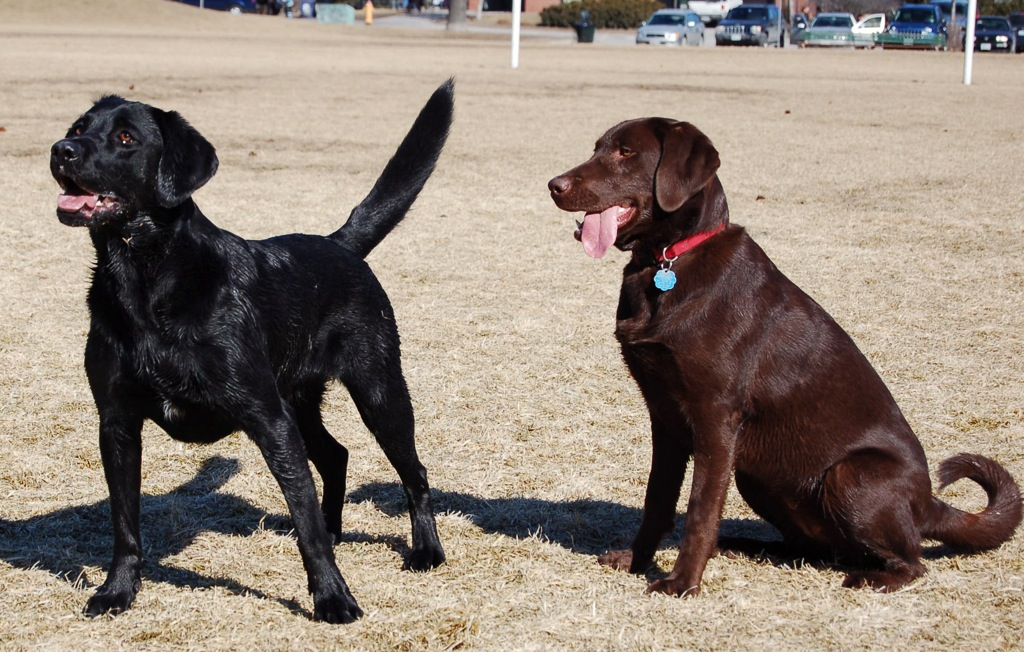
Labradors showing eumelaninistic colour phenotypes: Black (BB,Bb) and chocolate (bb).

The three recognised colours of Labrador Retrievers result from differences in two genetic loci that affect pigment expression. Those affecting the colour of the dark pigment, eumelanin, are referred to as the B (brown) locus. The variation displayed by this locus is observed in many mammals, reflecting a so-called 'dilution', a lightening, of black eumelanin to a brown colour. Initial genetic research excluded a role for the melanocortin 1 receptor and the Agouti locus as being the cause of the black dilution trait in dogs. Instead, TYRP1 (tyrosinase related protein 1) was found to be responsible. This enzyme is localised to melanosomes, the cellular organelles that produce and store pigments, and serves to catalyze oxidation of eumelanin precursors.

In dogs, three mutations in the TYRP1 gene have been identified, one resulting in a truncation of the protein, the other two leading to an amino acid deletion or a single amino acid substitution in the sequence of the protein. All of these mutations are found across the range of dogs, and hence are thought to have preceded the divergence of distinct breeds, and all three are found within Labrador Retrievers. Each of the mutations appears to eliminate or significantly reduce enzymatic activity, and the colouration phenotypes (the visible traits) produced by the three mutations are indistinguishable.

These represent recessive mutations in the TYRP1 gene, and since mammals have two copies of each gene, one from each parent, an animal with at least one copy of the fully functioning TYRP1 protein (represented as 'B') will display the dominant trait, black pigmentation, while to display brown pigmentation, both copies of this gene must be mutant alleles (collectively represented as 'b'). Thus a dog with the genotypes BB or Bb will express black eumelanin, while brown eumelanin will be seen in dogs with the bb genotype.

=== Eumelanin distribution ===
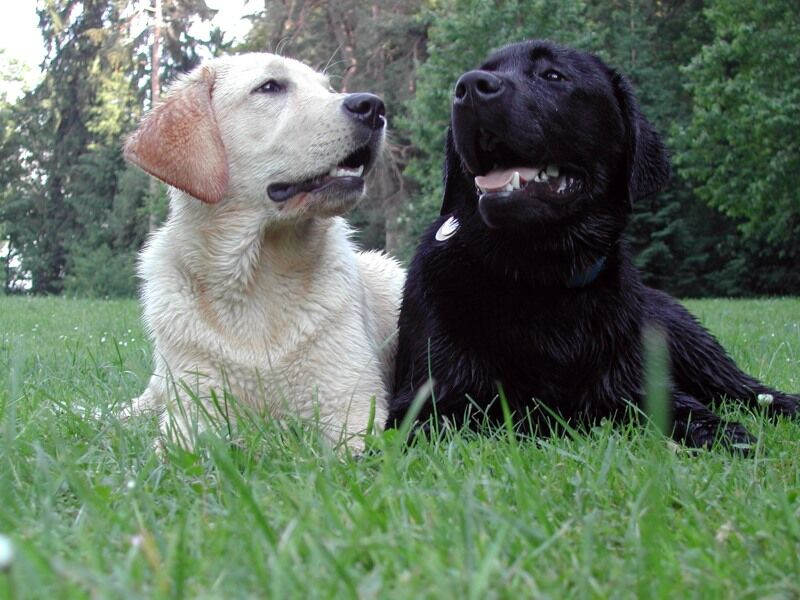
Yellow Labrador with a Black Labrador. Gain-of-function alleles at various genetic loci will cause either the dominant inheritance of a yellow coat and the dominant inheritance of a black coat. (Note: Candille, et al. 2007 note that "Mc1r activation causes exclusive production of eumelanin, whereas Mc1r inhibition causes exclusive production of pheomelanin (5, 10). Thus, gain-of-function Mc1r mutations cause dominant inheritance of a black coat, whereas gain-of-function Agouti mutations cause dominant inheritance of a yellow coat.")

A second gene affects whether these eumelanin pigments will be expressed in the fur or solely in the skin. Called the 'extension' (E) trait, this is directed by the melanocortin 1 receptor (MC1R). This receptor signals the pigment-producing cell in response to melanocortins and results in deposition of eumelanin into the hair. Mutations in this protein have been shown to be involved in pale or red colour phenotypes in a range of species, including humans, horses, pigs, cattle, mice, fur seals, mammoths and the Kermode bear, as well as colouration in whiptail lizards.

In most dogs, activity of MC1R is modulated by two signaling molecules, a repressor that is a product of the Agouti gene (A locus), and an activator, β-Defensin 103 (CBD103), recently named the K locus. In Labradors a highly-active mutated version of the K gene, (K^{B}) is invariant, producing uniform eumelanin distribution independent of the Agouti genotype and leaving differences in MC1R to mediate the sole variability of this signaling pathway.

A recessive mutation in this E gene truncates the protein, producing a non-functional receptor incapable of directing eumelanin deposition in the fur. Among dogs, this mutation is unique to yellow Labrador Retrievers and Golden Retrievers and is thought to have arisen in the retriever population before these individual breeds became distinct. The exact mutation has also been found to underlie the colouration of white coyotes found around Newfoundland, having apparently passed into that population through interbreeding with a Golden Retriever.

A variant of the functional MC1R allele that produces a facial 'mask' in other breeds of dogs (E^{m}) is also present in Labradors, but since the colour of the mask is determined by the B locus, in Labradors the mask this gene produces is indistinguishable from the overall coat colour.

=== Eumelanin gene interactions ===
The interplay between these two genes determines the colour of a Labrador Retriever, and is widely used as an example of epistasis. If a dog possesses the dominant phenotype for the extension allele (genotype EE or Ee), then it will display the fur colouration determined by its brown locus genotype, while a dog with the recessive extension trait (ee) will have a yellow coat with either black (BB, Bb) or brown (bb) exposed skin. This results in the three coat colours seen:

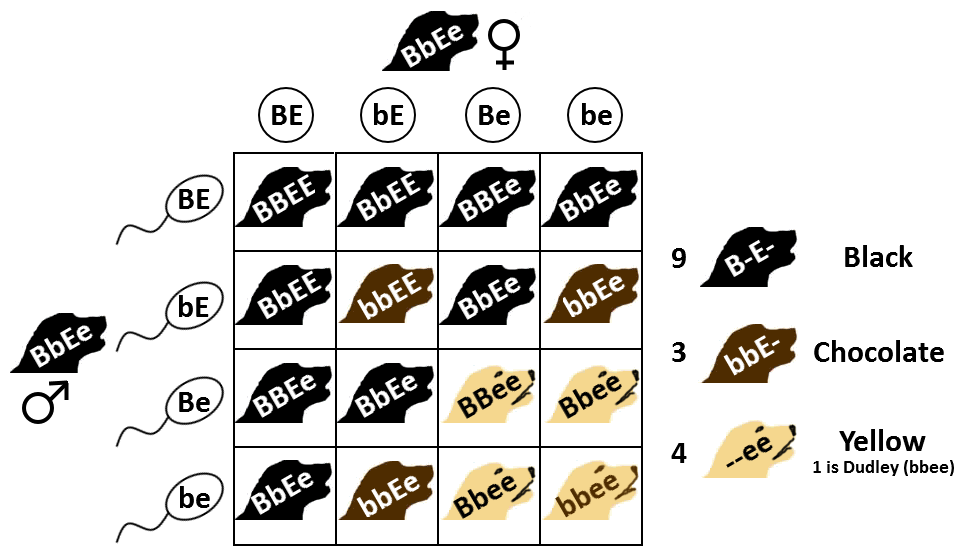

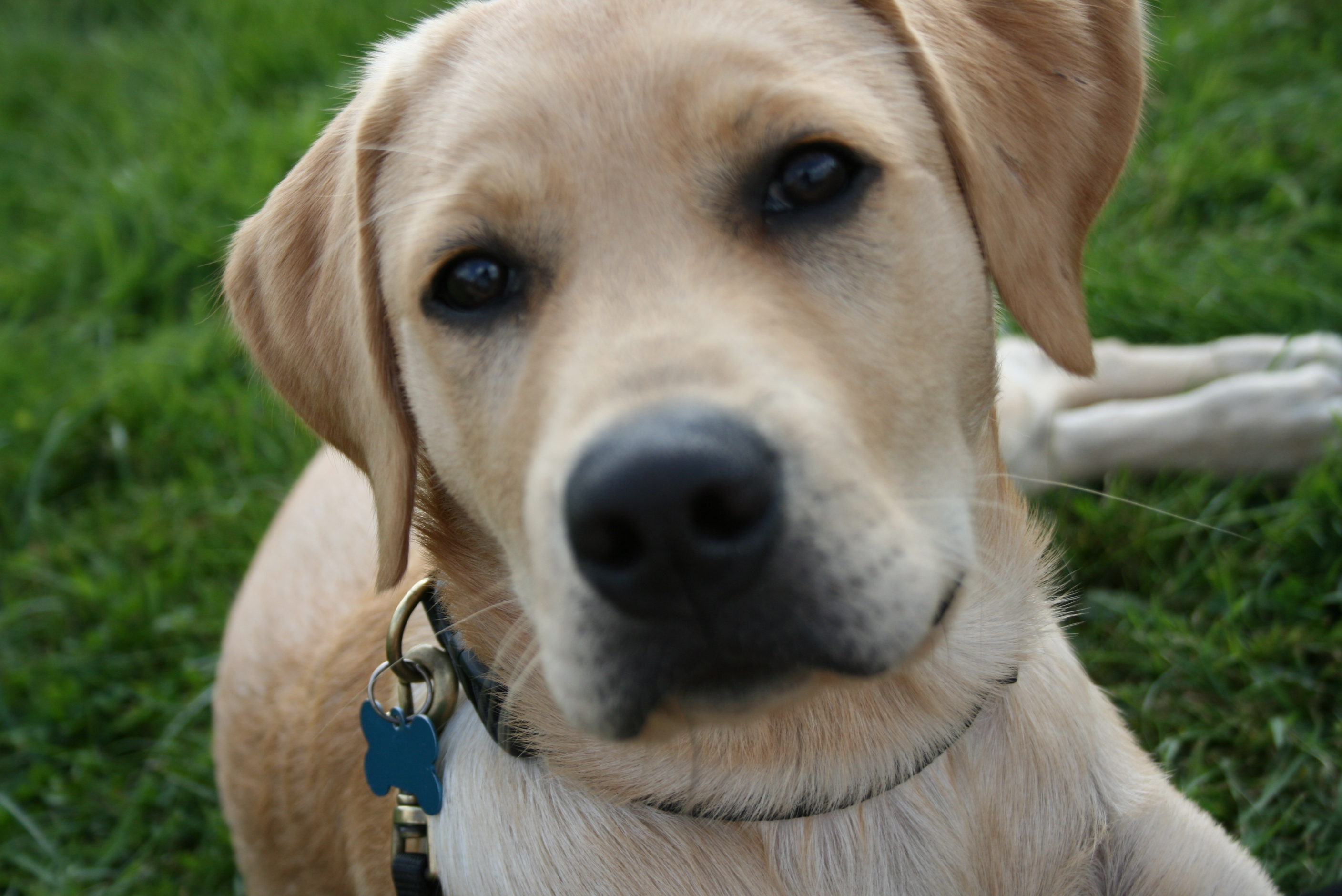
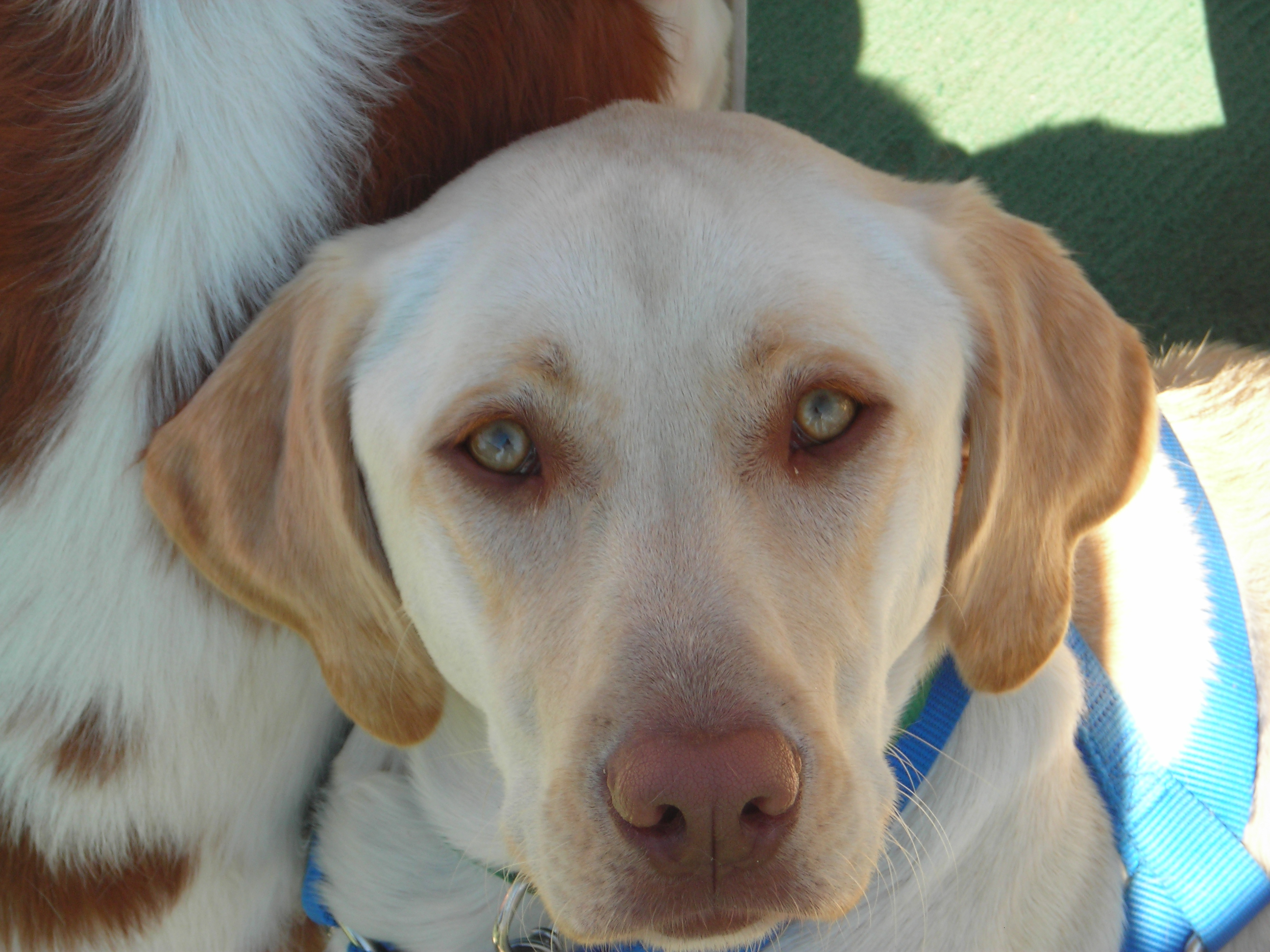
Yellow Labradors with black (top) and brown skin colouration, as seen in the exposed areas of the noses, lips and lining of the eyes.
- Black Labradors can have any genotype with at least one dominant allele at both the B and E loci: BBEE, BBEe, BbEE, or BbEe.
- Chocolate Labradors will have a genotype with at least one dominant E allele, but must have only recessive b alleles: bbEE and bbEe.
- Yellow Labradors with black skin pigment will have a dominant B allele but must have recessive e alleles: BBee or Bbee.
- Yellow Labradors with pale or chocolate pigment, or an absence of skin pigment, can have only recessive alleles at both loci: bbee. These dogs are often referred to as Dudleys, and are disqualified in the showring, although are eligible for registration under current standards. Aging-related declines in eumelanin production can cause the exposed skin in a Labrador with black skin pigmentation begin to appear lighter, but Dudley dogs have this colouration throughout their lives.

These genes assort independently, so a single genetic cross involving two black Labradors each with a recessive allele at both the B and the E locus (BbEe) has the potential of producing all of the possible colour combinations, while crosses involving chocolate dogs can never produce black (there being no dominant B allele in either parent) but can give rise to yellow. Yellow Labradors will breed true with regard to fur colour but those with black skin can potentially produce a Dudley. Dudleys breed true for both fur and skin. The ability of the E locus to override the coat colour directed by the B locus is a classical example of epistasis, where multiple genetic loci affect the same observed trait.

In a study of Labrador retrievers in the United Kingdom, it was found that chocolate labradors had a shorter average lifespan than either black or yellow labradors. They were also found to suffer from more skin and ear disorders. It is unknown whether this is a direct consequence of their melanin genotype, or is due to other recessive genes, amplified through the inbreeding used to propagate the chocolate phenotype.

== The dilute gene in the Labrador Retriever ==
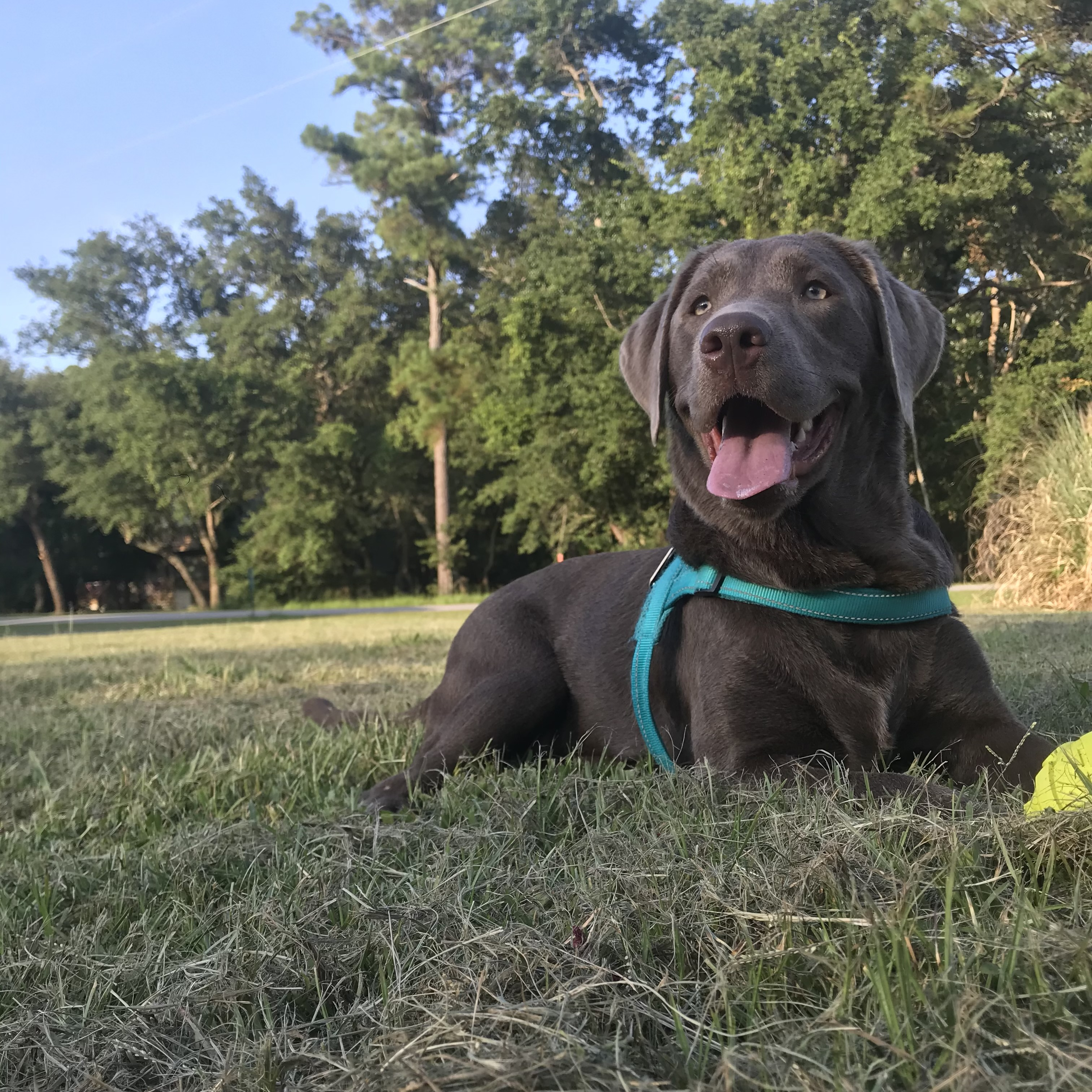
Silver Labrador

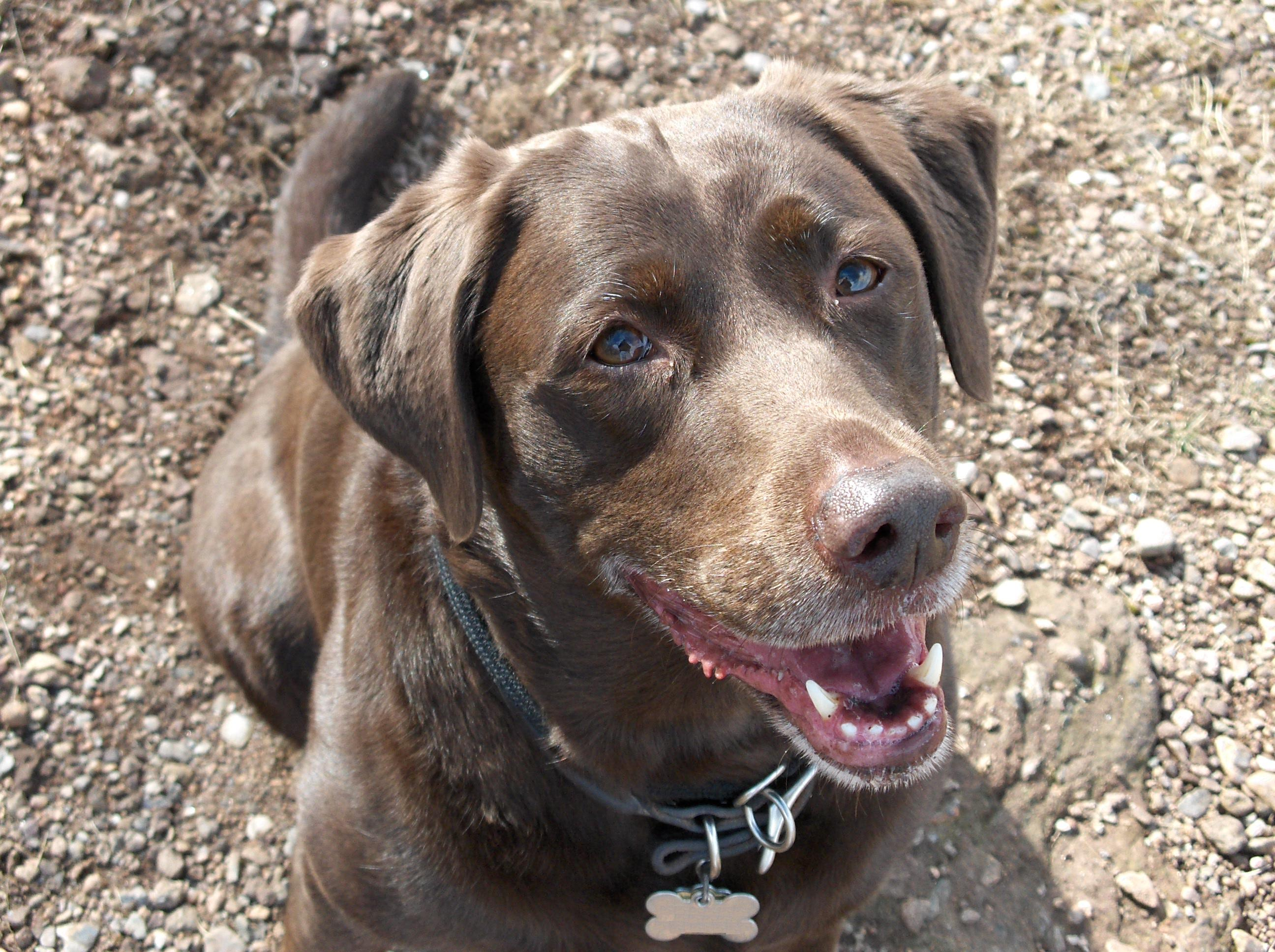
A lilac (diluted chocolate) Labrador

The American Kennel Club (AKC) and other kennel clubs around the world recognize three coat colours in the Labrador: black, yellow and chocolate. In recent years, other colours have become more prominent in the breed through cross breeding with other breeds. Breeders refer to these colours as 'silver', 'charcoal' and 'champagne'. These dogs typically have a metallic-looking sheen to the hair. These are conformation disqualifications within the breed and are linked with a skin disease known as Color Dilution Alopecia. The gene affecting this colour variation in all dog breeds is the recessive 'dilution' (D) locus. It is possible for each of the standard colour genotypes to be diluted if the dog carries two copies of the recessive dilute allele, dd. Dogs that carry at least one D will not have a diluted coat. If two dogs carrying the Dd genotype are bred, diluted offspring could be produced. Studies have linked the diluted trait to a mutation in the melanophilin (MLPH) gene.

The dilution factor was not originally a visible part of the genetics of Labrador Retrievers, and therefore, controversy surrounds the topic. Novel pigmentation can arise through long-masked recessive traits being brought to the fore by inbreeding to select for other traits, through undisclosed outbreeding with other breeds to introduce novel traits, or through spontaneous mutation. There are many breeders in the United States who specialize in breeding these diluted Labradors. The standard for Labrador Retriever does not include dilution colours, and stipulate that any dilute is a breed disqualification, although the American Kennel Club will register purebred Labs that are dilute in colour under the colours of black, yellow or chocolate. The Labrador Retriever Club, Inc. states that there is no silver gene in pure-bred Labrador Retrievers. However, the American Kennel Club has maintained that their registry is based on parentage, not colour.

== Mosaics and other "mis-marks" ==
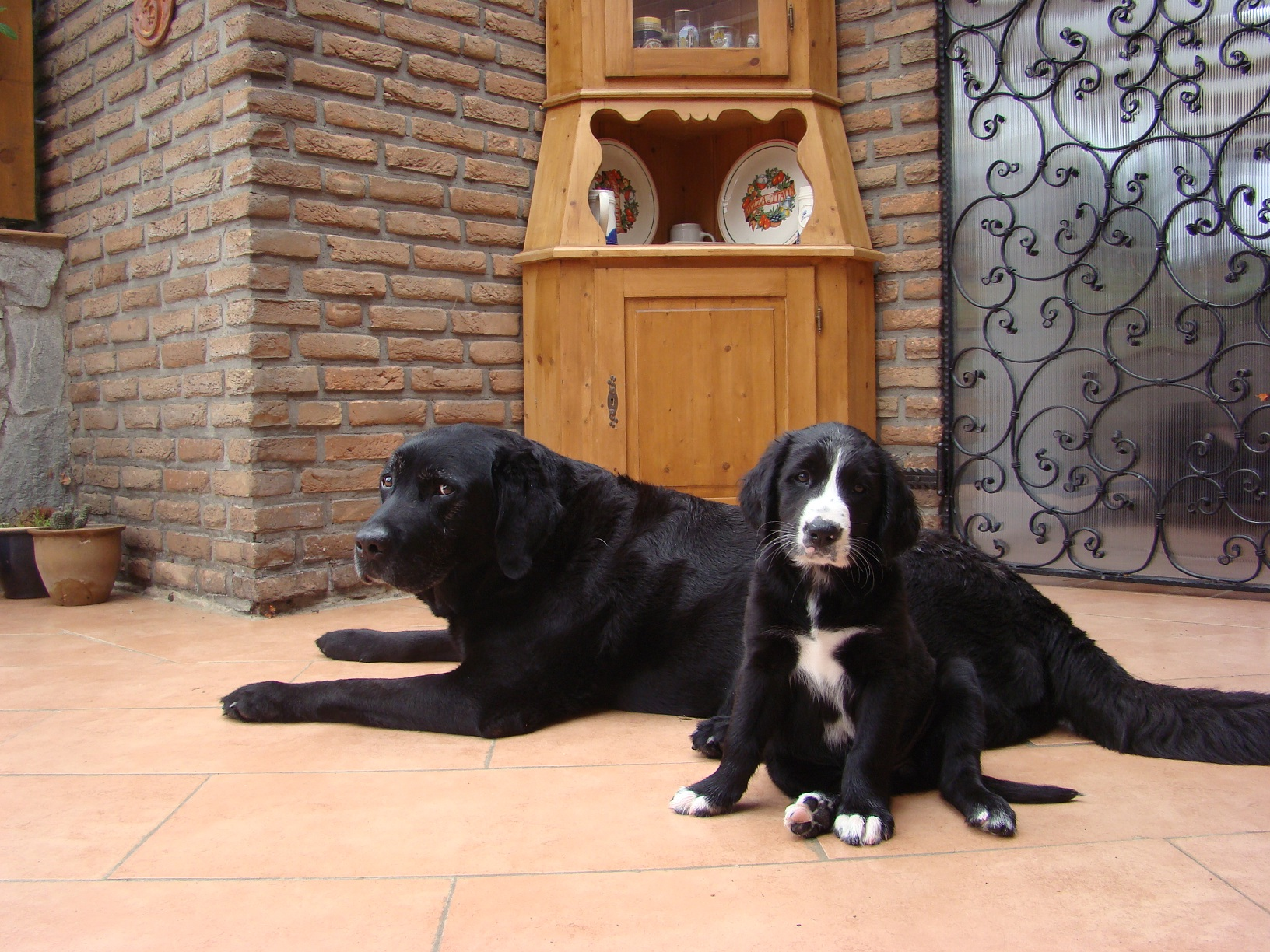
Labrador pup with white face and chest markings characteristic of its ancestor, the St John's water dog.

At least one example of a Labrador Retriever mosaic for pigmentation has been described. This male dog exhibited random but distinct black and yellow patches throughout his coat. He was the result of a black female heterozygous for yellow (B_Ee) bred to a yellow male (B_ee), and was mated with Labradors of each of the recognised colours. The resulting puppies were all consistent with the inheritance pattern of a yellow Labrador with black pigment. The most probable cause was either a somatic mutation early in development or a fusion between two zygotes that left some cells with genetics capable of producing dark fur, and others including the reproductive cells incapable of doing so.

Other "mis-marks" such as brindle, tan points, white spots, and rings around the tails are not uncommon in Labradors. Each of these conditions have various underlying genetic as well as environmental causes.

== See also ==
- Dog coat genetics
