= DEFB127 =

Protein-coding gene in humans

Identifiers
- Aliases: DEFB127, C20orf73, DEF-27, DEFB-27, DEFB27, bA530N10.2, hBD-27, defensin beta 127
- External IDs: GeneCards: DEFB127

Gene location (Human)
Chr.	Chromosome 20 (human)
Band	20p13	Start	157,454 bp
Band	20p13	End	159,163 bp
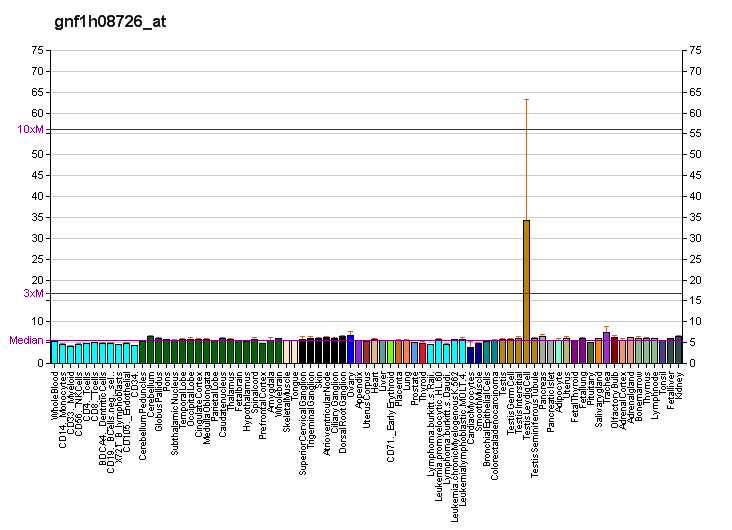
RNA expression pattern
Bgee	Human / Mouse (ortholog); Top expressed in: corpus epididymis; tail of epididymis; testicle; caput epididymis; mucosa of ileum; kidney; human kidney; skin of abdomen / n/a; More reference expression data
BioGPS	More reference expression data
Gene ontology
Molecular function	protein binding
Cellular component	extracellular region; cell surface; cellular component
Biological process	defense response; defense response to bacterium; innate immune response; antimicrobial humoral immune response mediated by antimicrobial peptide
Sources:Amigo / QuickGO
Orthologs
Databases	NCBI: entry; OMA: entry
Species	Human	Mouse
Entrez	140850	n/a
Ensembl	ENSG00000088782	n/a
UniProt	Q9H1M4	n/a
RefSeq (mRNA)	NM_139074	n/a
RefSeq (protein)	NP_620713	n/a
Location (UCSC)	Chr 20: 0.16 – 0.16 Mb	n/a
PubMed search		n/a
- Wikidata
View/Edit Human

Beta-defensin 127 is a protein that in humans is encoded by the DEFB127 gene.

Defensins are cysteine-rich cationic polypeptides that are important in the immunologic response to invading microorganisms. The protein encoded by this gene is secreted and is a member of the beta defensin protein family. Beta defensin genes are found in several clusters throughout the genome, with this gene mapping to a cluster at 20p13.
