= DEFB126 =

Protein-coding gene in humans

Identifiers
- Aliases: DEFB126, C20orf8, DEFB-26, DEFB26, bA530N10.1, hBD-26, HBD26, defensin beta 126
- External IDs: GeneCards: DEFB126

Gene location (Human)
Chr.	Chromosome 20 (human)
Band	20p13	Start	142,590 bp
Band	20p13	End	145,751 bp
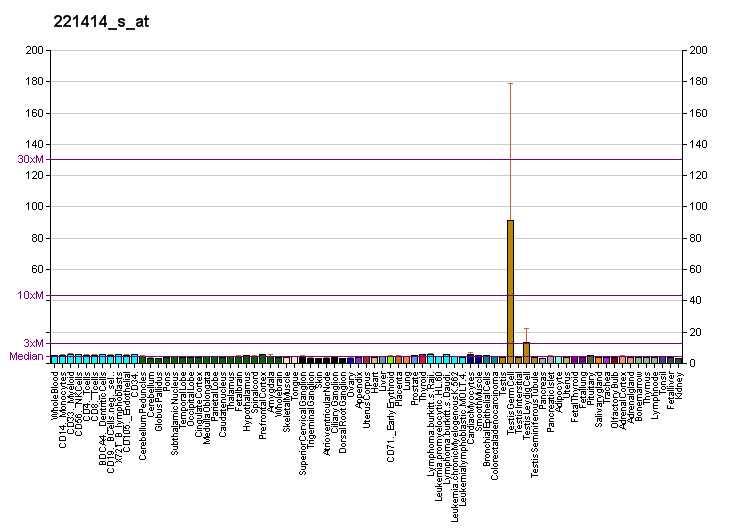
RNA expression pattern
Bgee	Human / Mouse (ortholog); Top expressed in: tail of epididymis; testicle; corpus epididymis; gonad; sperm; caput epididymis; seminal vesicula; muscle tissue; sensory organ; face / n/a; More reference expression data
BioGPS	More reference expression data
Orthologs
Databases	NCBI: entry; OMA: entry
Species	Human	Mouse
Entrez	81623	n/a
Ensembl	ENSG00000125788	n/a
UniProt	Q9BYW3	n/a
RefSeq (mRNA)	NM_030931	n/a
RefSeq (protein)	NP_112193	n/a
Location (UCSC)	Chr 20: 0.14 – 0.15 Mb	n/a
PubMed search		n/a
- Wikidata
View/Edit Human

Beta-defensin 126 is a protein that in humans is encoded by the DEFB126 gene.

== Function ==
Defensins are cysteine-rich cationic polypeptides that are important in the immunologic response to invading microorganisms. The protein encoded by this gene is secreted and is a member of the beta defensin protein family. Beta defensin genes are found in several clusters throughout the genome, with this gene mapping to a cluster at 20p13. The encoded protein is highly similar to an epididymal-specific secretory protein (ESP13.2) from cynomolgus monkey.

It has been suggested that a common variation in the DEFB126 gene generates abnormal mRNA and can somewhat impair fertility.
