= Plant defensin =

Host-defense peptide family in plants

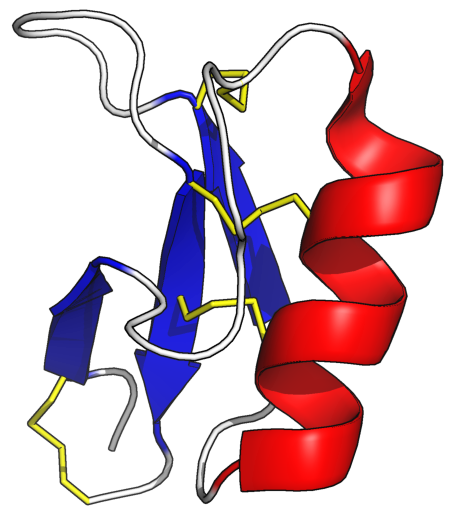
- The plant defensin NaD1 with alpha helix in red, beta strands in blue, disulphide bonds in yellow (PDB: 1mr4)

Identifiers
- Symbol: Plant defensin
- Pfam: PF00304
- Pfam clan: CL0054
- InterPro: IPR008176
- PROSITE: PDOC00725
- SCOP2: 1gps / SCOPe / SUPFAM
- OPM superfamily: 58
- OPM protein: 1jkz
- CDD: cd00107
Available protein structures:
- PDB: IPR008176 PF00304 (ECOD; PDBsum)
- AlphaFold: IPR008176; PF00304

Plant defensin
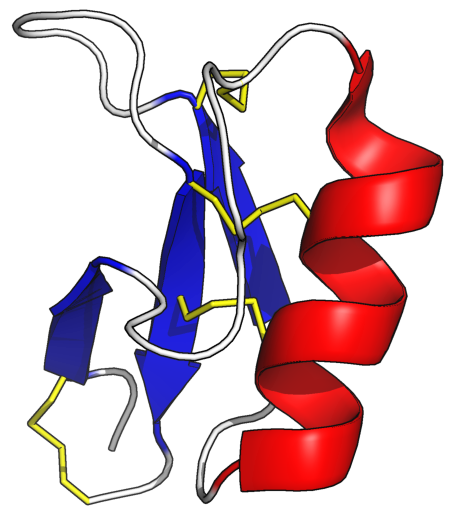
- The plant defensin NaD1 with alpha helix in red, beta strands in blue, disulphide bonds in yellow (PDB: 1mr4)

Identifiers
- Symbol: Plant defensin
- Pfam: PF00304
- Pfam clan: CL0054
- InterPro: IPR008176
- PROSITE: PDOC00725
- SCOP2: 1gps / SCOPe / SUPFAM
- OPM superfamily: 58
- OPM protein: 1jkz
- CDD: cd00107
Available protein structures:
- PDB: IPR008176 PF00304 (ECOD; PDBsum)
- AlphaFold: IPR008176; PF00304

Plant defensins (formerly gamma-thionins) are a family of primitive, highly stable, cysteine-rich defensins found in plants that function to defend them against pathogens and parasites. Defensins are integral components of the innate immune system and belong to the ancient superfamily of antimicrobial peptides (AMPs). AMPs are also known as host defense peptides (HDPs), and they are thought to have diverged about 1.4 billion years ago before the evolution of prokaryotes and eukaryotes. They are ubiquitous in almost all plant species, functionally diverse, and their primary structure varies significantly from one species to the next, except for a few cysteine residues, which stabilize the protein structure through disulfide bond formation. Plant defensins usually have a net positive charge due to the abundance of cationic amino acids and are generally divided into two classes. Those in the class II category contain a C-terminal pro-peptide domain of approximately 33 amino acids and are targeted to the vacuole, while the class I defensins lack this domain and mature in the cell wall. Unlike their class I counterparts, class II plant defensins are relatively smaller, and their acidic C-terminal prodomain is hypothesized to contribute to their vacuolar targeting. The first plant defensins were discovered in barley and wheat in 1990 and were initially designated as γ-thionins. In 1995, the name was changed to 'plant defensin' when it was identified that they are evolutionarily unrelated to other thionins and were more similar to defensins from insects and mammals.

== Tissue-specific localization ==
A large number of defensins were initially isolated from seeds, where they are linked to the defense of germinating seeds against fungal pathogens, but recent advances in bioinformatics and molecular biology techniques have revealed that these peptides are present in other parts of the plant, including flowers and roots. Defensins can be expressed in two ways: constitutively or induced under certain stresses. For example, the defensin AtPDF2.2 from Arabidopsis thaliana is expressed constitutively, while another defensin from the same plant is induced by methyl jasmonate and ethylene.

== Structure and evolution ==
Secondary structure of main types of plant defensins (with cysteines numbered). The 8-cysteine variant is the most common. Alpha helix in red, beta strands in blue, disulphide bonds in yellow.

Plant defensins are members of the protein superfamily called the cis-defensins or CSαβ fold. This superfamily includes arthropod defensins and fungal defensins (but not defensins found in mammals). It also includes several families of proteins not involved in the immune system, including plant S-locus 11 proteins involved in self-incompatibility during reproduction and toxin proteins in scorpion venoms. Defensin proteins are produced as an amphipathic protein precursor with one or two pro-domains that are removed to make the final mature protein. In their mature form, they generally consist of about 45 to 50 amino acid residues. The folded globular structure is characterized by a well-defined 3-stranded anti-parallel beta-sheet and a short alpha-helix. The structure of most plant defensins is cross-linked by four disulfide bridges: three in the core and one linking the N- and C-termini. Some plant defensins have only the core three disulfides, and a few have been found with an additional one (resulting in five total bridges). Two of these bonds, those formed between the α-helix and the last β-strand, are arranged into the Cys-stabilized α-helix β-strand (CSαβ) motif, which play significant roles in their biological activities and stability. The globular structures of plant defensins make them resistant to degradation by proteolytic digestion and stable up to a pH and a temperature range of 10 and 90 degrees Celsius, respectively.

== Functions ==
Plant defensins are a large component of the plant innate immune system. They are regarded as highly promiscuous molecules due to their diverse biological functions. A plant genome typically contains large numbers of different defensin genes that vary in their efficacy against different pathogens and the amount they are expressed in different tissues. In addition to their functions in the immune system, many of these low-molecular-weight peptides have developed additional roles in aiding reproduction and abiotic stress tolerance.

=== Antimicrobial activity ===
Plant defensins elicit diverse antimicrobial properties, including antibacterial, and antifungal activities. The modes of action of different defensins depend on the type of organism and specific molecular targets, although their exact mechanisms of action vary. For instance, their antifungal activities, which are their best-characterized property, are attributed to their ability to interact with lipid structures on pathogenic fungi surfaces. These include sphingolipids, glucosyceramide, and phosphatidic acid Apart from their capacity to attack and damage fungal membranes, these peptides have also been extensively researched for their capacity to trigger apoptosis and target other intracellular structures and biomolecules. Plant defensins can spread their lethality by interfering with important developmental and/or regulatory processes, such as the cell cycle, when they perturb or disrupt the membrane of the fungus they target. On the other hand, their ability to induce apoptosis has been linked to the bioaccumulation of reactive oxygen species and the recruitment of specific caspases and caspase-associated proteins/ In mediating their antibacterial mechanisms, plant defensin has been shown to cause loss of cell viability by inducing an unfavorable morphological change in the bacterial target via membrane targeting and permeation. This defensin-membrane interaction has been linked to the presence of the cationic amino acid residues arginine, lysine, and histidine. Furthermore, studies have shown that plant defensin inhibits in vitro protein synthesis in a cell-free system, and their interactions with the DNA of bacterial pathogens have also been documented, hinting that they might have a lethal effect on DNA replication or transcription.

=== Enzyme inhibition ===
Some plant defensins have also been identified as enzyme inhibitors of α-amylase or trypsin. It is believed that these are antifeedant activities to deter insects. Typically, molecular modeling analysis of defensin expressed in Vigna unguiculata revealed that defensin inhibits α-amylase in the weevils Acanthoscelides obtectus and Zabrotes subfasciatus by binding via its N-terminal to the active site of the enzyme. Defensins with alpha-amylase-inhibitory activity have also been identified in Sorghum bicolor, suggesting defensins might interfere with carbohydrate metabolism in insect targets. Beyond their ability to inhibit alpha-amylases, defensins also demonstrate inhibitory properties toward trypsin and chymotrypsin. For instance, two defensins from the seeds of Cassia fistula have been documented to inhibit the activity of trypsin, and Capsicum annuum (CanDef-20) defensin has been reported to alter insect metabolism and retard growth in a number of ways, such as upregulation of lipase, serine endopeptidase, glutathione S-transferase, cadherin, alkaline phosphatase, and aminopeptidases and triggering transposon mobilization in Helicoverpa armigera.

=== Anti-cancer ===
An additional promiscuous activity of some plant defensins is stopping the growth or disrupting the membranes of cancer cells in in vitro experiments. This interaction is basically facilitated and made stable due to the negatively charged membrane components on cancer cells relative to the positive charge of defensin. Typically, in addition to reducing the viability of melanoma and leukemia cells, Nicotiana alata defensin 1 (NaD1) reportedly induces the death of tumor cells within 30 minutes of contact. This necrotic-like cell killing was facilitated by the binding of NaD1 to the plasma membrane lipid, phosphatidylinositol 4,5-bisphosphate (PIP_{2}), which resulted in subsequent cell lysis. Defensins from plant origins have also shown potent toxicity towards colon and breast cancer.

=== Abiotic stress tolerance ===
Plant defensins are expressed in diverse organelles and tissues in plants, and exposure of plants to specific environmental stresses has been associated with increased expression of defensin, suggesting their function in abiotic stress defense. By means of endoplasmic reticulum adaptive activity, plant defensins AhPDF1.1 and AhPDF1.2 were recently found to exhibit metal (Zn) tolerance in yeast and plants. Also, a defensin from paddy has been documented to sequester cadmium in rice, preventing its intracellular distribution. Overexpression of chickpea defensin gene also confers tolerance to water-deficit stress in Arabidopsis thaliana.

== Examples ==
The following plant proteins belong to this family:

- The flower-specific Nicotiana alata defensin (NaD1)
- Gamma-thionins from Triticum aestivum (wheat) endosperm (gamma-purothionins) and gamma-hordothionins from Hordeum vulgare (barley) are toxic to animal cells and inhibit protein synthesis in cell free systems.
- A flower-specific thionin (FST) from Nicotiana tabacum (common tobacco).
- Antifungal proteins (AFP) from the seeds of Brassicaceae species such as radish, mustard, turnip and Arabidopsis thaliana (thale cress).
- Inhibitors of insect alpha-amylases from sorghum.
- Probable protease inhibitor P322 from Solanum tuberosum (potato).
- A germination-related protein from Vigna unguiculata (cowpea).
- Anther-specific protein SF18 from sunflower. SF18 is a protein that contains a gamma-thionin domain at its N-terminus and a proline-rich C-terminal domain.
- Glycine max (soybean) sulfur-rich protein SE60.
- Vicia faba (broad bean) antibacterial peptides fabatin-1 and -2.

== Databases ==
PhytAMP is a database for antimicrobial peptides, including defensins. Defensins Sequence Space is a database for cis-defensins.

== Subfamilies ==
- Gamma Purothionin InterPro: IPR008177
This article incorporates text from the public domain Pfam and InterPro: IPR008176
