= Phoratoxin and viscotoxin =

Phoratoxins are a group of peptide toxins that belong to the family of thionins, a subdivision of small plant toxins (5 kD MW). Phoratoxins are proteins present in the leaves and branches of the Phoradendron, commonly known as the American variant of the mistletoe, a plant commonly used as decoration during the festive season. The berries of the mistletoe do not contain phoratoxins, making them less toxic compared to other parts of the plant. The toxicity of the mistletoe is dependent on the host tree, since mistletoe is known to be a semi-parasite. The host tree provides fixed inorganic nitrogen compounds necessary for the mistletoe to synthesize phoratoxins.

Viscotoxins are similar plant thionins produced from the leaves and stems of the European mistletoe (Viscum album). It also contains the unrelated toxic lectin, viscumin. This protein functions by the same mechanism as ricin on ribosomal rRNA which permanently inactivates protein synthesis and is responsible for the massively higher toxicity of V. album compared to the North American variety which does not appear to contain this class of toxins.

== History ==
The history of phoratoxin is filled with myths, legends, and other magical stories. Mistletoe is a semi-parasitic plant occasionally using oak trees as their host. To historic peoples such as the Gauls and the Druids, oak trees were sacred. This led to beliefs that the mistletoe containing viscotoxin was a cure all drug for illnesses. These stories lived on for many years and were spread through the Americas by European settlers who came to the United States and mistook the American mistletoe (Phoradendron) for the more toxic European mistletoe (Viscum album). This made sure the mysterious past belonging to viscotoxin is shared by phoratoxin.

== Structure and reactivity ==
The folding motif and overall topology of phoratoxins are identical to that of crambin. Phoratoxin proteins fold into two anti-parallel amphipathic helices that are perpendicular to a double stranded beta sheet and a C-terminal coil region. The general configuration of the protein resembles the shape of the Greek capital letter gamma. Phoratoxin contains three disulfide bridges. Phoratoxin expresses different features that are typical for membrane active proteins, it is compact, contains many basic amino acid residues and it contains one weakly polar flat face.

It is likely that phoratoxins have multiple aggregation states and can either exist as a monomer, a dimer, or a tetramer consisting of a dimer of dimers. The state of aggregation depends on the presence of inorganic phosphate or phospholipids. The aggregates are hydrophobic and hydrophilic dimers, joined by intermolecular interaction. Bridging of the hydrophilic dimer is only possible when inorganic phosphate ion is present, making inorganic phosphate ion presence necessary for lattice formation. This inorganic phosphate ion increases the toxin stability by neutralizing the positively charged basic amino acids of the monomers, creating possibilities for more Van Der Waals interactions.

Phoratoxin is an amphipathic molecule, a feature that is frequently found in membrane binding proteins. Phoratoxin has a positive membrane binding site that can bind negatively charged phospholipids. This phospholipid binding site is located in between the alpha helix and the beta sheet. The phosphate fits in a binding pocket near Lys-1, while the glycerol part as well as the two termini of the bound phospholipid move towards the random coil region (residue 36–44).

== Available forms ==
>P. tomentosum phoratoxin A
KSCCPTTTARNIYNTCRFGGGSRPVCAKLSGCKIISGTKCDSGWNH
>P. tomentosum phoratoxin B
KSCCPTTTARNIYNTCRFGGGSRPICAKLSGCKIISGTKCDSGWDH
>P. tomentosum phoratoxin C
KSCCPTTTARNIYNTCRFGGGSRPICAKLSGCKIISGTKCDSGWTH
>P. tomentosum phoratoxin D
KSCCPTTTARNIYNTCRFGGGSRPICAKLSGCKIISGTKCD
>P. tomentosum phoratoxin E
KSCCPTTTARNIYNTCRFGGGSRPVCAKLSGCKIISGTKCDSGWDH
>P. tomentosum phoratoxin F
KSCCPTTTARNIYNTCRLAGGSRPICAKLSGCKIISGTKCDSGWNH

There are six forms of phoratoxin known to exist. Five out of six forms are 46 amino acids long; only phoratoxin D is 41 amino acids long. The differences between these six forms are mainly centered in the random coil region of the protein (residue 36-44/41). In phoratoxin F, Phe-18 and Gly-19 are mutated into a leucine and an alanine. Phenylalanine and leucine are both hydrophobic, however phenylalanine is large, aromatic and strand-preferring, while leucine is medium in size and prefers to be in a helix. Glycine and alanine are both small amino acids, but glycine prefers turns while alanine prefers helices, and glycine is extremely flexible and intermediate while alanine is hydrophobic. Assuming phoratoxin folds in the exact same manner as crambin residues 7-19 are in an alpha helix. This mutation makes the helix of phoratoxin F more stable than helix in the other phoratoxin forms. A second difference in the various forms of phoratoxin is Val-25/Ile-25, in the second alpha-helix coding region. The fact that valine and isoleucine are both beta branched, the beta sheet is their secondary structure of preference. Since both of these amino acids are also hydrophobic this mutation is thought to have little interference with the folding and stability of the protein. The last differentiation in amino acid configuration is at Asn-45/Asp-45/Thr-45. This mutation is not in a region coding for a specific secondary protein structure. Asparagine and aspartic acid are both hydrophilic, while threonine has intermediate hydrophilicity. Asparagine and aspartic acid are both larger than threonine, and both asparagine and aspartic acid like to be in a turn while threonine prefers a beta strand. Aspartic acid and asparagine carry a formal charge. This charge however is negative for aspartic acid and positive for asparagine.

== Synthesis ==
Phoratoxin has not been synthesized in a lab yet. It can, however, be extracted from the Phoradendron. Phoratoxin is located most in the leaves and berries of the plant. It can be isolated from the plant by means of chromatography or extracted with an acid, and thereafter purified with an amide.

== Metabolism ==
There is not a lot of available information about the mechanism of action of phoratoxin. It is however known that phoratoxin has a high affinity for phospholipids, and therefore able to disrupt cell membranes. There is no metabolic activity as the protein already expresses its toxic trait, and stays intact the way it was synthesized in the Phoradendron.

== Efficacy and side effects ==
Phoratoxin can have many different effects depending on the dose. Symptoms can vary from very mild to severe effects and even death. Mild symptoms are diarrhea, abdominal pain, nausea and blurred vision.

More severe symptoms are reflex bradycardia, which is a reduction in the blood pressure due to the decrease in cardiac output via an increase in heart rate, negative inotropic effects on the heart muscle, which weakens the force of muscle contractions, and In high doses, the narrowing of skin and skeletal muscle blood vessels. However, the average, healthy adult can withstand some of the toxin of the plant without having any symptoms. It is more dangerous and can be lethal for small kids and animals.

Phoratoxin is hemolytic and causes cell leakage and cell lysis by interacting with the phospholipids. This is used in a study for cancer treatment. The phoratoxin lyses the cancer cells, killing them. It supposedly helps with the chemotherapy and radiation as well, but little research has been done on this subject. In some countries, this is also used for illegal abortions, where tea is brewed from the leaves of the mistletoe plant.

== Toxicity ==
Phoratoxin is the toxin that is present in the American mistletoe (Phoradendron leucarpum). Most cases that have led to toxicity of phoratoxin are due to the accidental ingestion of mistletoe during the Christmas season and are related to accidental intake of berries by children. There is only limited data concerning accidental exposure to American Mistletoe.

One study shows the symptoms of 1,754 exposures to mistletoe. There were no cases of major symptoms and only a small percentage had moderate symptoms. A few cases were present where the people had minor effects (symptoms that were minimally bothersome to the patient). The majority of the people who were exposed to the mistletoe had no symptoms. In all of the cases that were investigated in the study, there were no fatalities or had an outcome associated without morbidity.

Another study shows out of 92 human cases exposed to American mistletoe, there were 14 symptomatic cases, from which 11 were related to the exposure of phoratoxin. The symptoms included six gastrointestinal upset cases, two mild drowsiness cases, one eye irritation case, one ataxia case (21 months) and one case of seizure (13 months). The amount of ingested mistletoe ranged from one berry or leaf to more than 20 berries or 5 leaves. American mistletoe has also been associated with nausea, vomiting, abdominal cramps and diarrhea, but the development of these symptoms is very rare. Even though there is limited data present, the American mistletoe is not as toxic as most people think. The majority of the patients did not receive any symptoms.

== Effects in vivo ==
In studies it has turned out that phoratoxin can depolarize the membrane of frog skeletal muscle. Phoratoxin increases the resting membrane conductance, this conductance is sensitive to external calcium. This relationship will indicate an interaction between Ca^{2+} and the toxin molecule at the membrane level. The Ca^{2+} dependence of the depolarizing effect of the toxin suggests that the phoratoxin B can alter the structural integrity of the membrane phospholipid layer. This indicated that the phoratoxin behaves as a detergent on the membrane.

== Medical applications ==
Phoratoxin is hemolytic and can therefore depolarize the cell membranes in cardiac and skeletal muscles. It appears to be cytotoxic to cancer cells, for this reason the mistletoe is increasingly used as a natural and holistic treatment for cancer. However, this is not completely new, in 1904 a letter to The Lancet from a British officer in the Indian Army Medical Corps was written that the mistletoe mixtures were used to "purge away black bile and mucous humours" and "drawing out gross humours from the depths of the body".

== Prevention and treatment ==
There is no antiserum available for phoratoxin ingestion yet. However, there are a few steps in treating phoratoxin poisoning. First, it is important to wipe the mouth to remove any remaining pieces. Activated carbon can be administered to prevent further toxins to be absorbed in the body. Also, fluids can be administered via a drips line, if necessary. In case of a high dose of phoratoxin ingestion, gastrointestinal decontamination is performed.

Prevention of phoratoxin poisoning can be done by avoiding eating wild berries or plants in the wild, washing hands during hiking or camping in the wild before eating, and with the use of artificial rather than real decorative plants during the Christmas season.
