= DEFB105A =

Protein-coding gene in humans

Identifiers
- Aliases: DEFB105A, BD-5, DEFB-5, DEFB105, defensin beta 105A
- External IDs: MGI: 1924924; GeneCards: DEFB105A

Gene location (Human)
Chr.	Chromosome 8 (human)
Band	8p23.1	Start	7,821,004 bp
Band	8p23.1	End	7,823,880 bp

Gene location (Mouse)
Chr.	Chromosome 8 (mouse)
Band	8|8 A1.3	Start	19,161,947 bp
Band	8|8 A1.3	End	19,164,866 bp
RNA expression pattern
Bgee	Human / Mouse (ortholog); Top expressed in: muscle tissue; cell; blood; somatic cell; white blood cell; monocyte; renal cortex; endometrium; exocrine gland; cervix / Top expressed in: zone of skin; testicle; More reference expression data
BioGPS	n/a
Orthologs
Databases	NCBI: entry; OMA: entry
Species	Human	Mouse
Entrez	245908	77674
Ensembl	ENSG00000186562	ENSMUSG00000043787
UniProt	Q8NG35	Q8K4N3
RefSeq (mRNA)	NM_152250	NM_152802
RefSeq (protein)	NP_689463	NP_690015
Location (UCSC)	Chr 8: 7.82 – 7.82 Mb	Chr 8: 19.16 – 19.16 Mb
PubMed search
- Wikidata
View/Edit Human	View/Edit Mouse

Beta-defensin 105 is a protein that is encoded by the DEFB105A gene in humans.

Defensins form a family of microbicidal and cytotoxic peptides made by neutrophils. Defensins are short, processed peptide molecules that are classified by structure into three groups: Alpha defensins, Beta defensins and Theta defensins. All beta-defensin genes are densely clustered in four to five syntenic chromosomal regions. Chromosome 8p23 contains at least two copies of the duplicated beta-defensin cluster. This duplication results in two identical copies of defensin, beta 105, DEFB105A and DEFB105B, in tail-to-tail orientation. This gene, DEFB105A, represents the more centromeric copy.
