= DEFB129 =

Protein-coding gene in humans

Identifiers
- Aliases: DEFB129, C20orf87, DEFB-29, DEFB29, bA530N10.3, hBD-29, defensin beta 129
- External IDs: MGI: 3644405; GeneCards: DEFB129

Gene location (Human)
Chr.	Chromosome 20 (human)
Band	20p13	Start	227,258 bp
Band	20p13	End	229,886 bp

Gene location (Mouse)
Chr.	Chromosome 2 (mouse)
Band	2|2 H1	Start	152,300,975 bp
Band	2|2 H1	End	152,306,540 bp
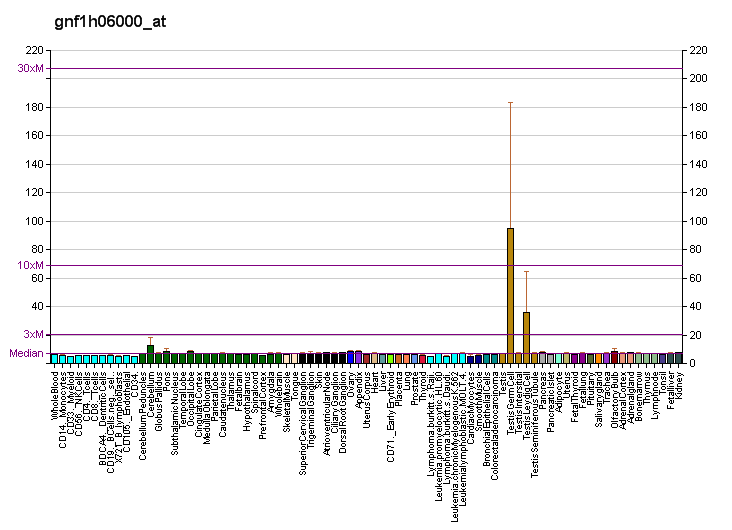
RNA expression pattern
Bgee	Human / Mouse (ortholog); Top expressed in: corpus epididymis; tail of epididymis; sperm; seminal vesicula; caput epididymis; sural nerve; apex of heart; integument; abdominal segment of trunk; abdomen / Top expressed in: zygote; ovary; primary oocyte; hypothalamus; secondary oocyte; blastocyst; testicle; lung; white adipose tissue; genital tubercle; More reference expression data
BioGPS	More reference expression data
Orthologs
Databases	NCBI: entry; OMA: entry
Species	Human	Mouse
Entrez	140881	629114
Ensembl	ENSG00000125903	ENSMUSG00000074681
UniProt	Q9H1M3	Q30KP0
RefSeq (mRNA)	NM_080831	NM_001037933
RefSeq (protein)	NP_543021	NP_001033022
Location (UCSC)	Chr 20: 0.23 – 0.23 Mb	Chr 2: 152.3 – 152.31 Mb
PubMed search
- Wikidata
View/Edit Human	View/Edit Mouse

Beta-defensin 129 is a protein that in humans is encoded by the DEFB129 gene.

Defensins are cysteine-rich cationic polypeptides that are important in the immunologic response to invading microorganisms. The protein encoded by this gene is secreted and is a member of the beta defensin protein family. Beta defensin genes are found in several clusters throughout the genome, with this gene mapping to a cluster at 20p13.
