= DEFB104A =

Protein-coding gene in the species Homo sapiens

Identifiers
- Aliases: DEFB104A, BD-4, DEFB-4, DEFB104, DEFB4, hBD-4, defensin beta 104A
- External IDs: GeneCards: DEFB104A

Gene location (Human)
Chr.	Chromosome 8 (human)
Band	8p23.1	Start	7,836,436 bp
Band	8p23.1	End	7,841,242 bp
RNA expression pattern
Bgee	Human / Mouse (ortholog); Top expressed in: endometrium; cell; monocyte; vagina; blood; urinary system; kidney; exocrine gland; head; salivary gland / n/a; More reference expression data
BioGPS	n/a
Gene ontology
Molecular function	chemoattractant activity
Cellular component	extracellular region; cell surface
Biological process	defense response; defense response to bacterium; monocyte chemotaxis; innate immune response; positive chemotaxis; cellular response to phorbol 13-acetate 12-myristate
Sources:Amigo / QuickGO
Orthologs
Databases	NCBI: entry; OMA: entry
Species	Human	Mouse
Entrez	140596	n/a
Ensembl	ENSG00000176782; ENSG00000285034	n/a
UniProt	Q8WTQ1	n/a
RefSeq (mRNA)	NM_080389	n/a
RefSeq (protein)	NP_001035792	n/a
Location (UCSC)	Chr 8: 7.84 – 7.84 Mb	n/a
PubMed search		n/a
- Wikidata
View/Edit Human

Beta-defensin 104 is a protein that in humans is encoded by the DEFB104A gene.

== Function ==
Defensins form a family of microbicidal and cytotoxic peptides made by neutrophils. Defensins are short, processed peptide molecules that are classified by structure into three groups: alpha-defensins, beta-defensins and theta-defensins.

== Gene location ==
All beta-defensin genes are densely clustered in four to five syntenic chromosomal regions. Chromosome 8p23 contains at least two copies of the duplicated beta-defensin cluster. This duplication results in two identical copies of defensin, beta 104, DEFB104A and DEFB104B, in head-to-head orientation. This gene, DEFB104A, represents the more centromeric copy.
