= DEFA1B =

Protein-coding gene in the species Homo sapiens

Identifiers
- Aliases: DEFA1B, HNP-1, HP-1, HP1, defensin alpha 1B
- External IDs: GeneCards: DEFA1B
Available structures
PDB	Human UniProt search: PDBe RCSB
PDB	List of PDB id codes 2KHT, 2PM1, 3GNY, 3H6C, 3HJ2, 3HJD, 3LO1, 3LO2, 3LO4, 3LO6, 3LO9, 3LOE, 3LVX, 4DU0, 4LB1, 4LB7, 4LBB, 4LBF

Gene location (Human)
Chr.	Chromosome 8 (human)
Band	8p23.1	Start	6,996,766 bp
Band	8p23.1	End	6,999,198 bp
RNA expression pattern
Bgee	Human / Mouse (ortholog); Top expressed in: monocyte; granulocyte; right lung; spleen; bone marrow; blood; bone marrow cell; upper lobe of left lung; placenta; right lobe of liver / n/a; More reference expression data
BioGPS	n/a
Orthologs
Databases	NCBI: entry; OMA: entry
Species	Human	Mouse
Entrez	728358	n/a
Ensembl	ENSG00000240247; ENSG00000285176	n/a
UniProt	P59665	n/a
RefSeq (mRNA)	NM_001302265; NM_001042500	n/a
RefSeq (protein)	NP_001035965; NP_001289194	n/a
Location (UCSC)	Chr 8: 7 – 7 Mb	n/a
PubMed search		n/a
- Wikidata
View/Edit Human

Defensin, alpha 1B a human protein that is encoded by the DEFA1B gene.

== See also ==
- defensin
