= Lingual antimicrobial peptide =

Peptide found in bovines

Identifiers
- Organism: Bos Taurus
- Symbol: LAP
- Entrez: 403090
- RefSeq (mRNA): NM_203435.4
- RefSeq (Prot): NP_982259.3
- UniProt: Q28880

Other data
- Chromosome: 27: 6.23 - 6.24 Mb
Search for
- Structures: Swiss-model
- Domains: InterPro

Lingual antimicrobial peptide (LAP) is a beta-defensin found in bovine internal epithelial tissue, in particular, that of the digestive tract. It has antimicrobial activity against many different pathogens. It was first isolated from an inflamed cattle tongue, hence its designation as lingual. Since then it has been found more extensively throughout the body; its presence has even been detected in bovine milk. Its expression is selective and increases in inflamed areas. LAP may have a closer relationship with immune response than simple antimicrobial activity, such as an association with growth factor activity.
