= Thionin =

Plant thionin
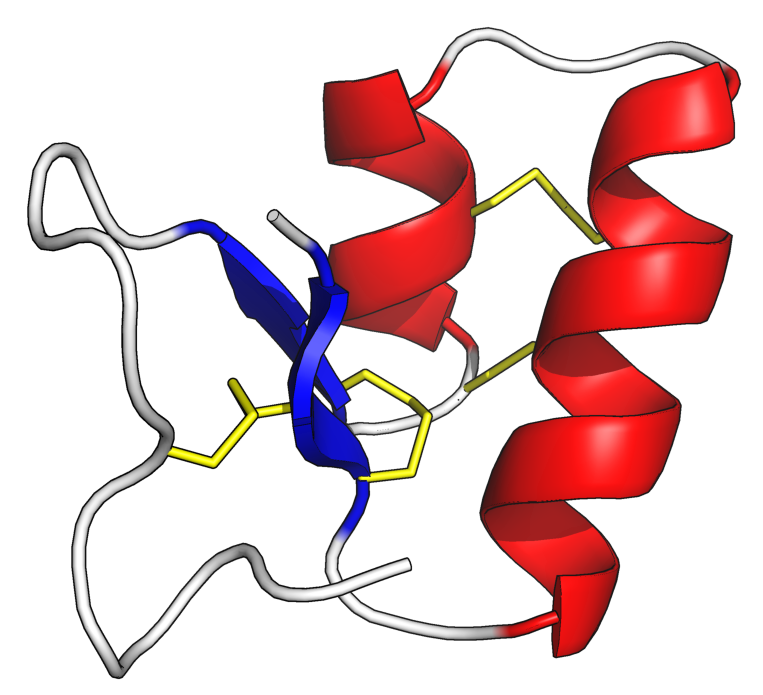
- Wheat beta-purothionin. Alpha helices in red, beta sheets in blue, disulphide bridges in yellow. PDB: 1BHP

Identifiers
- Symbol: Thionin
- Pfam: PF00321
- InterPro: IPR001010
- PROSITE: PDOC00244
- SCOP2: 1cnb / SCOPe / SUPFAM
- TCDB: 1.C.44
- OPM superfamily: 140
- OPM protein: 2plh
Available protein structures:
- Pfam: structures / ECOD
- PDB: RCSB PDB; PDBe; PDBj
- PDBsum: structure summary
- PDB: 1BHP

Thionins are a family of small proteins found solely in higher plants. Typically, a thionin consists of 45–48 amino acid residues. 6–8 of these are cysteine forming 3–4 disulfide bonds. They include phoratoxins and viscotoxins.

Alpha- and beta- thionins are related to each other. The gamma thionins have a superficially similar structure but are an unrelated class of protein, now called plant defensins.

== Activity ==
The proteins are toxic to animal cells, presumably attacking the cell membrane and rendering it permeable: this results in the inhibition of sugar uptake and allows potassium and phosphate ions, proteins, and nucleotides to leak from cells. Thionins are mainly found in seeds where they may act as a defence against consumption by animals. A barley (Hordeum vulgare) leaf thionin that is highly toxic to plant pathogens and is involved in the mechanism of plant defence against microbial infections has also been identified. The hydrophobic protein crambin from the Abyssinian kale (Crambe abyssinica) is also a member of the thionin family. Some thionins have cytotoxic activity and they are therefore interesting in the development of new drugs against cancer with novel action mechanisms. No thionin has yet been developed into an anti-cancer drug. Thionin is also a minor protein found in mustard (Brassica napus L.) seeds.

== Databases ==
A database for antimicrobial peptides, including thionins is available: PhytAMP.

== See also ==
- Crambins
- Gamma thionins
- Antimicrobial peptides
