= Arthropod defensin =

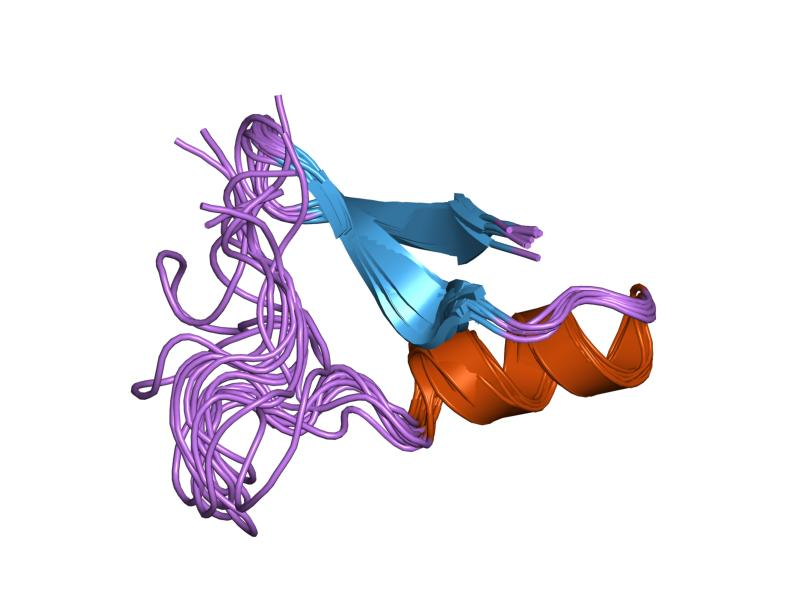
- Structure of insect defensin A.

Identifiers
- Symbol: Defensin_2
- Pfam: PF01097
- InterPro: IPR001542
- PROSITE: PDOC00356
- SCOP2: 1ica / SCOPe / SUPFAM
- TCDB: 1.C.47
- OPM superfamily: 58
- OPM protein: 1l4v
Available protein structures:
- PDB: IPR001542 PF01097 (ECOD; PDBsum)
- AlphaFold: IPR001542; PF01097

Arthropod defensins are a family defensin proteins found in mollusks, insects, and arachnids. These cysteine-rich antibacterial peptides are primarily active against Gram-positive bacteria and fungi in vitro. However Drosophila fruit flies mutant for the fly defensin were more susceptible to infection by the Gram-negative bacteria Providencia burhodogranariea, and resisted infection against Gram-positive bacteria like wild-type flies. It remains to be seen how in vitro activity relates to in vivo function. Mutants for the defensin-like antimicrobial peptide Drosomycin were more susceptible to fungi, validating a role for defensin-like peptides in anti-fungal defence.

== Structure ==
Arthropod defensin peptides range in length from 38 to 51 amino acids. There are six conserved cysteines all involved in intrachain disulfide bonds. Studies have shown that the cysteine-bridge disulfide bonds are not required for antimicrobial activity, similar to findings in mammalian defensins. Furthermore, it was also shown that the N-terminal helix region in arthropod or insect defensins is also not required for antimicrobial activity of these peptides.

A schematic representation of peptides from the arthropod defensin family is shown below.

           +----------------------------+
           |                            |
         xxCxxxxxxxxxxxxxxCxxxCxxxxxxxxxCxxxxxCxCxx
                          |   |               | |
                          +---|---------------+ |
                              +-----------------+

'C': conserved cysteine involved in a disulfide bond.

== Relation to other defensins ==
Sequence similarities have been reported between the arthropod defensins and mammalian defensins. However it appears that defensins of vertebrates, arthropods, plants, and fungi arose independently. This is supported by 3D structural differences between arthropod defensins and vertebrate beta defensins. However structural similarities exist between these defensins, notably in two structural motifs termed "C6" and "C8". This has prompted a higher "cis-" or "tras-" defensin classification system wherein the structural relationships of the shared motifs is used to delineate defensin similarities.

== Activity against non-microbial cells ==
Defensins of mammals display anti-cancer activities in vitro, and down-regulation of human beta-defensin 1 is associated with increased risk of prostate cancer and clear-cell carcinomas. The first in vivo anti-cancer functions for defensin came from Drosophila studies, which showed that the Drosophila defensin attacks tumor cells, and that flies lacking defensin had greater tumor growth in a cancer disease model.

Overactive immune signalling is also implicated in age-associated neurodegeneration, and overexpression of defensin leads to increased degradation of brain tissue.
