= Crambin =

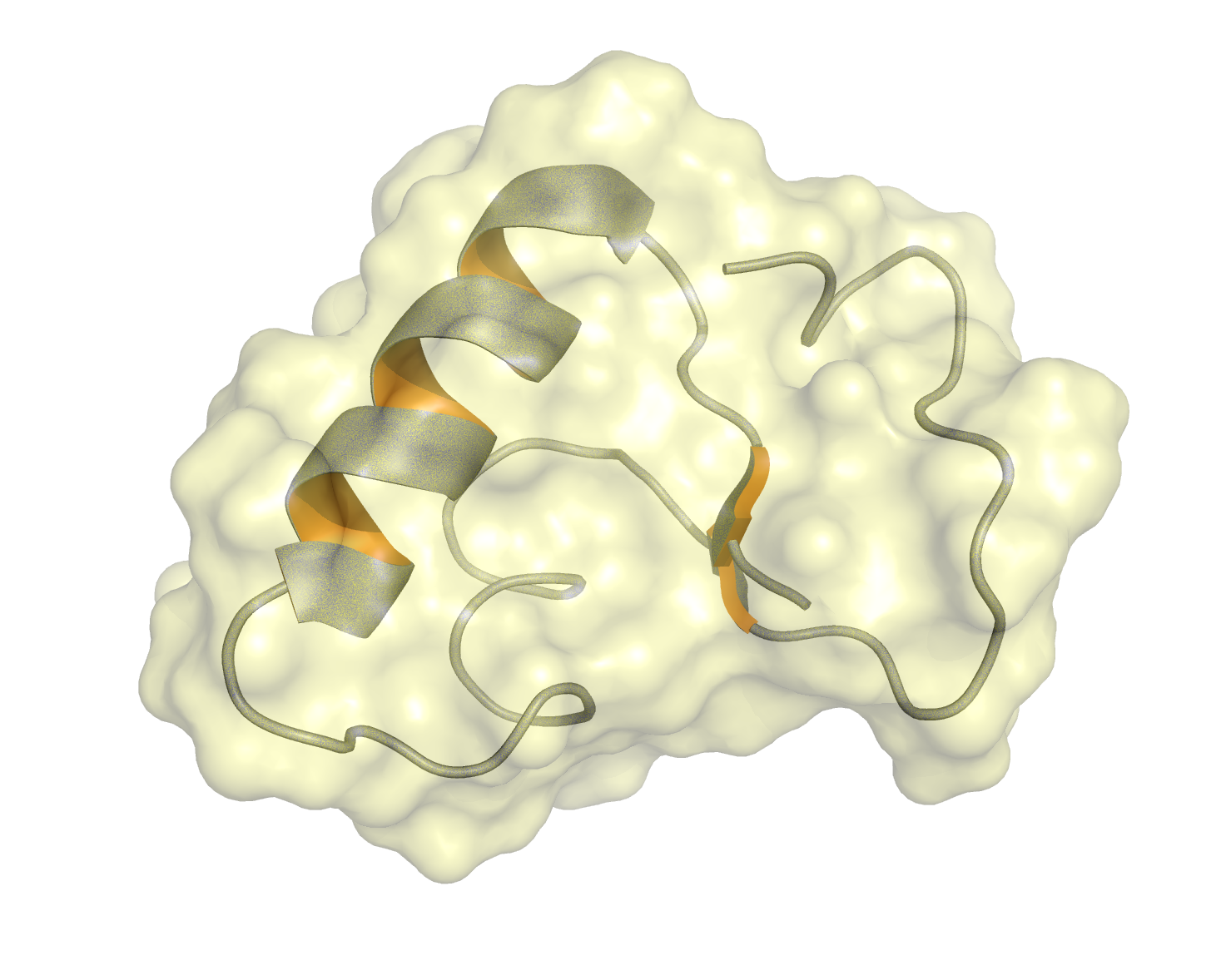
- Crystal structure of Crambin from PDB 3NIR

Identifiers
- Organism: Crambe hispanica
- Symbol: THI2
- Orthologs: OMA: entry
- UniProt: P01542
Search for
- Structures: Swiss-model
- Domains: InterPro

Crambin is a small seed storage protein from the Abyssinian cabbage. It belongs to thionins. It has 46 residues (amino acids). It has been extensively studied by X-ray crystallography since its crystals are unique and diffract to a resolution of 0.48 Å. Neutron scattering measurements are available also at a resolution of 1.1 Å.
