= Theta defensin =

θ-defensin
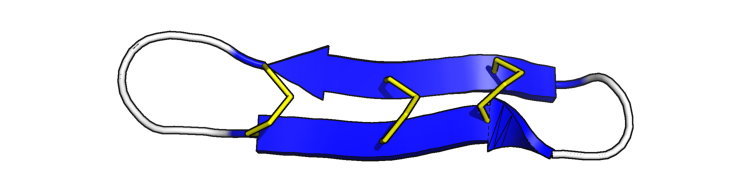
- Reconstructed human retrocyclin-2 (PDB: 2ATG)

Identifiers
- Symbol: N/A
- Pfam: PF00879
- OPM superfamily: 203
- OPM protein: 2atg
Available protein structures:
- PDB: PF00879 (ECOD; PDBsum)
- AlphaFold: PF00879
- UniProt family Pfam match is not exclusive of other defensins.

Theta-defensins (θ-defensins, retrocyclins, or demidefensins) are a family of mammalian antimicrobial peptides. They are found in non-human 'Old World' primates, but not in human, gorilla, bonobo, and chimpanzee.

== Structure ==
Structure of human retrocyclin-2 θ-defensin

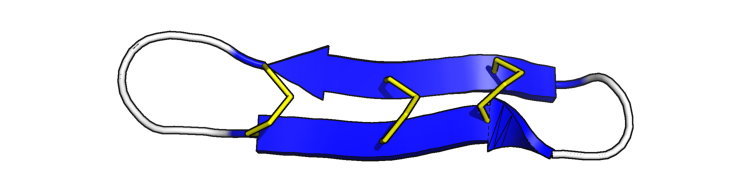
Secondary structure - Beta sheets in blue, loops in white, disulfides in yellow.

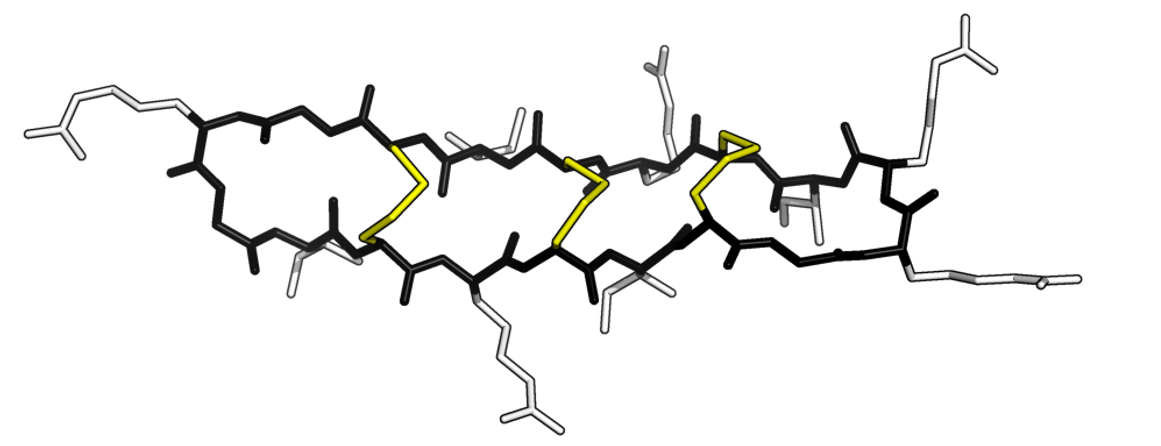
Chemical structure - Peptide backbone in black, side chains in white, disulfides in yellow.

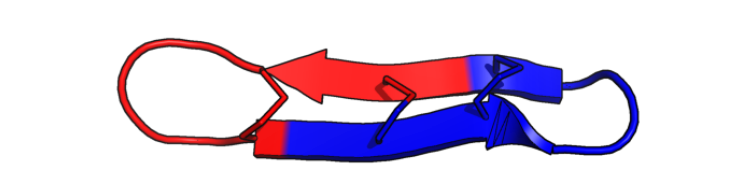
Monomers - Each half contributed by each of the two monomer precursors before cyclisation are indicated in red and blue.

θ-defensins are cyclic peptides of 18 amino acids (~2 kDa), possessing antimicrobial activity against a range of Gram-positive and Gram-negative bacteria, fungi, and some retroviruses. They consist of a pair of antiparallel β-sheets linked by three disulfide bonds arranged as a ladder along the sheets to form an extremely stable structure. Additionally, the peptides may self-associate into trimers.

== Biosynthesis ==
In rhesus macaque (Macaca mulatta) and olive baboon (Papio anubis), θ-defensins are produced from precursor proteins with 76 amino acids each. A single nine amino acid peptide is derived from each precursor. Two of these nine amino acid peptides are spliced together to form the circular 18 amino acid defensin. Since there are two precursor genes (rhesus theta defensin RTD-1 and RTD-2) they can form 3 different mature θ-defensins: the homodimer of processed RTD-1, The homodimer of processed RTD-2 or the heterodimer composed of both precursors. The heterodimeric form is the most abundant.

In the olive baboon, four θ-defensin precursor genes have been isolated: BTD-a, BTD-b, BTD-c and BTD-d, which encode subunits A, B, C and D. These four subunits could theoretically combine to produce 10 different processed defensins. However, only five have been observed: consisting of subunits A+A, A+B, A+C, A+D and B+B (Referred to as BTD-3, BTD-1, BTD-4, BTD7 and BTD-2 respectively). Finally, orangutan genomes encode 4 θ-defensin precursor genes and gibbon genomes encode 2.

== Activity ==
Antimicrobial activity has been reported against bacteria, fungi, enveloped viruses, and protozoa. Antimicrobial activity is generally through binding to and disrupting the cell membrane. Antiviral activity appears to derive from their binding to the sugar component of glycoproteins and blocking the entry of viruses into the cell.

== Evolution ==
=== Genesis ===
θ-defensins are extremely divergent members of the defensin protein superfamily which includes alpha-, beta- and big-defensins. The θ-defensins appear to have evolved from α-defensin genes around 40 million years ago in Old World monkeys. Compared to their α-defensin ancestors, θ-defensin genes are truncated into two halves.

=== Inactivaton ===
Although great apes do not produce θ-defensin proteins, their genomes do encode θ-defensin genes which are transcribed to mRNA but not translated due to a premature stop codon. When the mature defensin that would be expressed is chemically synthesised in a laboratory, it shows antimicrobial activity (including anti-retrovirus, leading to the name "retrocyclin"). It is unknown whether this pseudogenisation gave a selective advantage or was due to genetic drift. The anti-HIV activity of retrocyclins has been further enhanced by protein engineering efforts with the aim of generating a viable treatment.

== See also ==
- Defensin
  - α-defensin
  - β-defensin
- Cyclic peptide
