= Beta-defensin 106 =

Protein-coding gene in humans

DEFB106A

Identifiers
- Aliases: DEFB106A, BD-6, DEFB-6, DEFB106, defensin beta 106A
- External IDs: GeneCards: DEFB106A
Available structures
PDB	Human UniProt search: PDBe RCSB
PDB	List of PDB id codes 2LWL

Gene location (Human)
Chr.	Chromosome 8 (human)
Band	8p23.1	Start	7,825,139 bp
Band	8p23.1	End	7,829,053 bp
RNA expression pattern
Bgee	Human / Mouse (ortholog); Top expressed in: liver; cell; somatic cell; white blood cell; monocyte; blood; human musculoskeletal system; right lobe of liver; skeletal muscle; muscle of leg / n/a; More reference expression data
BioGPS	n/a
Gene ontology
Molecular function	lipopolysaccharide binding; heparin binding; protein binding; CCR2 chemokine receptor binding
Cellular component	extracellular region; nucleus; cell surface; extrinsic component of membrane; microvesicle; membrane
Biological process	defense response; defense response to bacterium; innate immune response
Sources:Amigo / QuickGO
Orthologs
Databases	NCBI: entry; OMA: entry
Species	Human	Mouse
Entrez	245909	n/a
Ensembl	ENSG00000186579; ENSG00000285617	n/a
UniProt	Q8N104	n/a
RefSeq (mRNA)	NM_152251	n/a
RefSeq (protein)	NP_689464	n/a
Location (UCSC)	Chr 8: 7.83 – 7.83 Mb	n/a
PubMed search		n/a
- Wikidata
View/Edit Human

Beta-defensin 106 is a protein that in humans is encoded by both the DEFB106A and DEF106B genes.

Defensins form a family of microbicidal and cytotoxic peptides made by neutrophils. Defensins are short, processed peptide molecules that are classified by structure into three groups: alpha-defensins, beta-defensins and theta-defensins. All beta-defensin genes are densely clustered in four to five syntenic chromosomal regions. Chromosome 8p23 contains at least two copies of the duplicated beta-defensin cluster. This duplication results in two identical copies of defensin, beta 106, DEFB106A and DEFB106B, in head-to-head orientation. This gene, DEFB106A, represents the more centromeric copy.

== Function ==
The purified DEFB106 showed antimicrobial activity against Escherichia coli, Candida albicans and Staphylococcus aureus.
