= Beta defensin 1 =

Protein found in humans

DEFB1
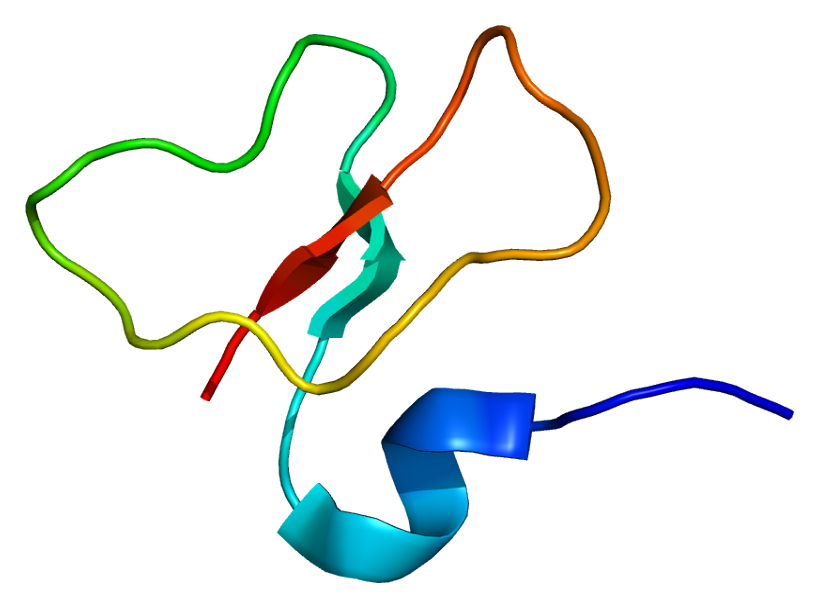

Identifiers
- Aliases: DEFB1, BD1, DEFB-1, DEFB101, HBD1, defensin beta 1
- External IDs: OMIM: 602056; MGI: 1096878; GeneCards: DEFB1
Available structures
PDB	Ortholog search: PDBe RCSB
PDB	List of PDB id codes 1E4S, 1IJU, 1IJV, 1KJ5, 2NLB, 2NLC, 2NLD, 2NLE, 2NLF, 2NLG, 2NLH, 2NLP, 2NLQ, 2NLS, 2PLZ

Gene location (Human)
Chr.	Chromosome 8 (human)
Band	8p23.1	Start	6,870,592 bp
Band	8p23.1	End	6,877,936 bp

Gene location (Mouse)
Chr.	Chromosome 8 (mouse)
Band	8 A2|8 10.35 cM	Start	22,266,615 bp
Band	8 A2|8 10.35 cM	End	22,285,201 bp
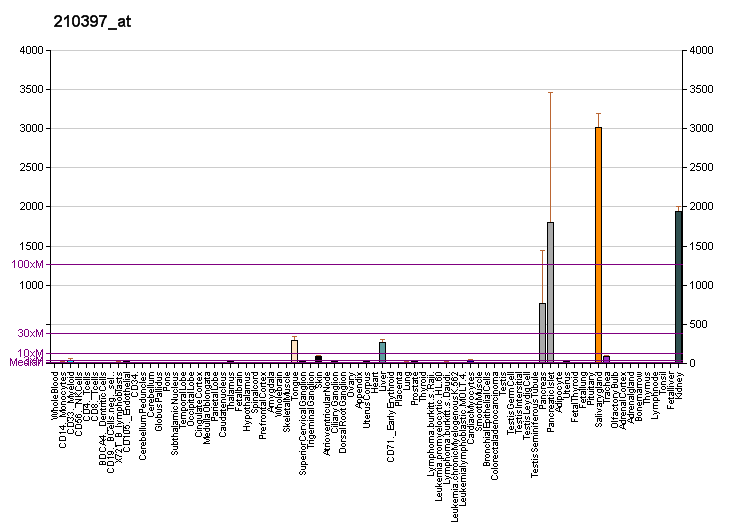
RNA expression pattern
Bgee	Human / Mouse (ortholog); Top expressed in: body of pancreas; salivary gland; skin of abdomen; minor salivary glands; human kidney; skin of leg; islet of Langerhans; mucosa of esophagus; olfactory zone of nasal mucosa; right lobe of liver / Top expressed in: conjunctival fornix; right kidney; human kidney; islet of Langerhans; lip; cornea; esophagus; skin of external ear; corneal stroma; ciliary body; More reference expression data
BioGPS	More reference expression data
Gene ontology
Molecular function	CCR6 chemokine receptor binding; protein binding; identical protein binding
Cellular component	Golgi lumen; extracellular region; extracellular exosome; sperm midpiece; extracellular space; extrinsic component of membrane; microvesicle; membrane
Biological process	chemotaxis; G protein-coupled receptor signaling pathway; defense response; innate immune response in mucosa; acute inflammatory response; response to bacterium; immune response; response to testosterone; positive regulation of flagellated sperm motility involved in capacitation; defense response to bacterium; calcium-mediated signaling using intracellular calcium source; cAMP-mediated signaling; defense response to Gram-negative bacterium; antimicrobial humoral response; innate immune response; antimicrobial humoral immune response mediated by antimicrobial peptide; defense response to Gram-positive bacterium
Sources:Amigo / QuickGO
Orthologs
Databases	NCBI: entry; OMA: entry
Species	Human	Mouse
Entrez	1672	13214
Ensembl	ENSG00000164825; ENSG00000284881	ENSMUSG00000044748
UniProt	P60022	P56386
RefSeq (mRNA)	NM_005218	NM_007843
RefSeq (protein)	NP_005209	NP_031869
Location (UCSC)	Chr 8: 6.87 – 6.88 Mb	Chr 8: 22.27 – 22.29 Mb
PubMed search
- Wikidata
View/Edit Human	View/Edit Mouse

Beta-defensin 1 is a protein that in humans is encoded by the DEFB1 gene.

Defensins form a family of microbicidal and cytotoxic peptides made by neutrophils. Members of the defensin family are highly similar in protein sequence. This gene encodes defensin, beta 1, an antimicrobial peptide implicated in the resistance of epithelial surfaces to microbial colonization. This gene maps in close proximity to defensin family member defensin, alpha 1, and has been implicated in the pathogenesis of cystic fibrosis. Single-nucleotide polymorphisms in the DEFB1 gene were associated with plasma kynurenine concentrations in major depressive disorder patients in a genome-wide association study.
