= Beta defensin =

Family of proteins

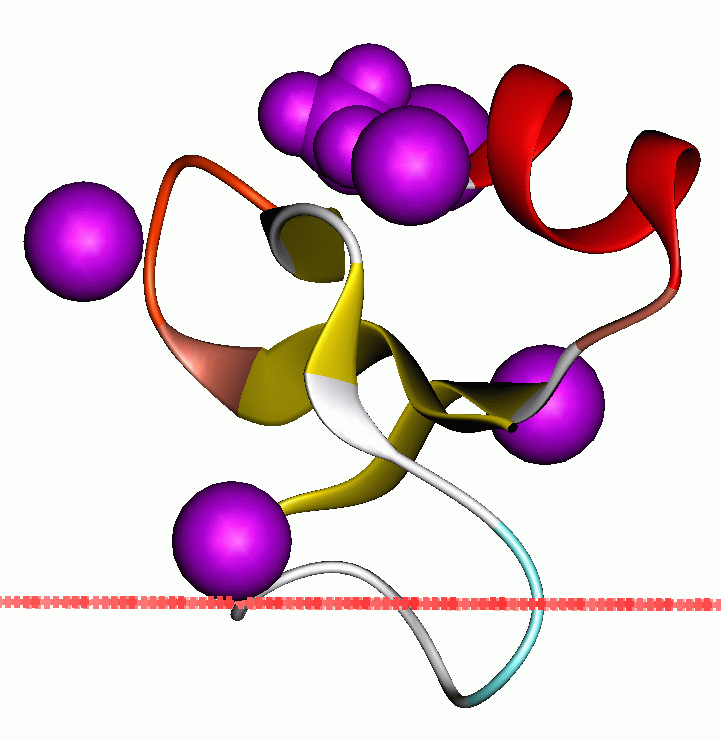

Identifiers
- Symbol: Defensin_beta
- Pfam: PF00711
- InterPro: IPR001855
- SCOP2: 1bnb / SCOPe / SUPFAM
- OPM superfamily: 54
- OPM protein: 1ut3
Available protein structures:
- PDB: IPR001855 PF00711 (ECOD; PDBsum)
- AlphaFold: IPR001855; PF00711

Beta defensins are a family of vertebrate defensins. The beta defensins are antimicrobial peptides implicated in the resistance of epithelial surfaces to microbial colonization.

Defensins are 2 to 6 kDa, cationic, microbicidal peptides active against many Gram-negative and Gram-positive bacteria, fungi, and enveloped viruses, containing three pairs of intramolecular disulfide bonds. On the basis of their size and pattern of disulfide bonding, mammalian defensins are classified into alpha, beta and theta categories. Every mammalian species explored thus far has beta-defensins. In cows, as many as 13 beta-defensins exist in neutrophils. However, in other species, beta-defensins are more often produced by epithelial cells lining various organs (e.g. the epidermis, bronchial tree and genitourinary tract).

Human, rabbit and guinea-pig beta-defensins, as well as human beta-defensin-2 (hBD2), induce the activation and degranulation of mast cells, resulting in the release of histamine and prostaglandin D2.

== Genes ==
β-defensins are coding for genes which impact the function of the innate immune system. These genes are responsible for production of antimicrobial peptides found in white blood cells such as macrophages, granulocytes and NK-cells, β-defensins are also found in epithelial cells. Single-nucleotide polymorphisms (SNPs) are found in genes coding for β-defensins. The presences of SNPs are lower in the coding regions compared to non-coding regions. The appearance of SNPs in the coding region will highly likely affecting the resistance against infections through changes in the protein sequences which will give rise to different biological functions.

== Initiation ==
Receptors such as toll-like receptors (TLR) and nod-like receptors (NLR) will activate the immune system by binding of ligands such as lipopolysaccharides and peptidoglycan. Toll-like receptors are expressed in intestinal epithelial cells or antigen presenting cells (APCs) such as dendritic cells, B-lymphocytes and macrophages. When the receptors are activated a cascade reaction will take place and substances such as cytokines and antimicrobial peptides will be released.

== Function ==
β-defensins are cationic and can therefore interact with the membrane of invading microbes, which are negative due to lipopolysaccharides (LPS) and lipoteichoic acid (LTA) found in the cell membrane. The peptides have higher affinity to the binding site compared to Ca2+ and Mg2+ ions. The peptides will therefore exchange place with those ions, thus affecting the stability of the membrane. The peptides have a greater size compared with the ions which cause changes in the membrane structure. Due to changes in the electric potential, peptides will pass across the membrane and thus aggregate into dimers. Pore complex will be created as a result of breaking the hydrogen bonds between the amino acids in the terminal end of the strands connecting defensins monomers. Formation of pore complex will cause membrane depolarization and cell lysis.

Defensins not only have the ability to strengthen the innate immune system but can also enhance the adaptive immune system by chemotaxis of monocytes, T-lymphocytes, dendritic cells and mast cells to the infection site. Defensins will also improve the capacity of macrophage phagocytosis.

== Avian β-defensins ==
β-defensins are classified in three classes and avian β-defensins constitute for one of the classes. This division is based on Zhang's classification and both the length, the homology of the peptides and the gene structure are factors affecting the classification.

Avian β-defensins are separated in avian heterophiles and non-heterophiles. Avian heterophiles can be divided into two sub-classes, depending on the number of present homologous residues in the genome.

Avian heterophiles lack protective oxidative mechanisms, such as superoxide and myeloperoxidase, making non-oxidative mechanisms, such as lysosomes and cationic peptides, even more important.

== Evolution ==
β-defensins genes are found across the vertebrates, including mammals, reptiles, birds and fish. The fact that alpha and theta defensins are absent in older vertebrates, like birds and fishes, indicates that defensins must have evolved from the same ancestral gene coding for β-defensins. Indeed, these defensins of this superfamily are related to the 'big defensins' which are found in invertebrate animals, indicating even earlier origins.

In 2001, it was thought that β-defensins were similar to the ancestral defensin from a comparison of sequences of β-defensins, α-defensins and insect defensins. Subsequent structural analyses have suggested that the β-defensins, α-defensins, θ-defensins and big defensins share an evolutionary origin, but are separate to the defensins found in insects, fungi and plants.

In addition to other antimicrobial defensins, there are related defensin-like proteins with have evolved other functions. These include toxins found in snakes (e.g. crotamine), bearded lizards and platypus.

== History ==
The first beta-defensin discovered was Tracheal Antimicrobial Peptide, found in the bovine airway in 1991. The first human beta-defensin, HBD1, was discovered in 1995, followed by the HBD2 in 1997.

== Human proteins containing this domain ==
DEFB1; DEFB103A; DEFB105A; DEFB105B; DEFB106; DEFB108B; DEFB109; DEFB110; DEFB111; DEFB114; DEFB130; DEFB136; DEFB4; SPAG11A;

== See also ==
- Defensin
  - α-defensin
  - β-defensin
  - θ-defensin
- Lingual antimicrobial peptide
