= DEFB103A =

Protein-coding gene in humans

Identifiers
- Aliases: DEFB103A, BD-3, DEFB-3, DEFB103, DEFB3, HBD3, HBP-3, HBP3, hBD-3, defensin beta 103A
- External IDs: GeneCards: DEFB103A
Available structures
PDB	Human UniProt search: PDBe RCSB
PDB	List of PDB id codes 1KJ6

Gene location (Human)
Chr.	Chromosome 8 (human)
Band	8p23.1	Start	7,881,392 bp
Band	8p23.1	End	7,882,663 bp
RNA expression pattern
Bgee	Human / Mouse (ortholog); Top expressed in: testicle; skin of leg; skin of abdomen; mucosa of esophagus; tonsil; ectocervix; mucosa of transverse colon; vagina; sural nerve; muscle of thigh / n/a; More reference expression data
BioGPS	n/a
Gene ontology
Molecular function	CCR6 chemokine receptor binding; chemoattractant activity
Cellular component	Golgi lumen; extracellular region; extracellular space
Biological process	defense response; defense response to bacterium; antimicrobial humoral response; defense response to Gram-negative bacterium; antimicrobial humoral immune response mediated by antimicrobial peptide; defense response to Gram-positive bacterium; chemotaxis; positive chemotaxis; cell chemotaxis
Sources:Amigo / QuickGO
Orthologs
Databases	NCBI: entry; OMA: entry
Species	Human	Mouse
Entrez	414325	n/a
Ensembl	ENSG00000176797; ENSG00000285376; ENSG00000284978	n/a
UniProt	P81534	n/a
RefSeq (mRNA)	NM_001081551	n/a
RefSeq (protein)	NP_001075020	n/a
Location (UCSC)	Chr 8: 7.88 – 7.88 Mb	n/a
PubMed search		n/a
- Wikidata
View/Edit Human

Beta-defensin 103 is a protein that in humans is encoded by the DEFB103A gene.

== Function ==
Defensins form a family of microbicidal and cytotoxic peptides made by neutrophils. Members of the defensin family are highly similar in protein sequence. This gene encodes defensin, beta 103A, which has broad spectrum antimicrobial activity and may play an important role in innate epithelial defense.

In dogs, the product of the same genetic locus, β-Defensin 103, also plays a role in pigmentation, being an agonist of the melanocortin 1 receptor.
