= Defensin =

Group of antimicrobial peptides

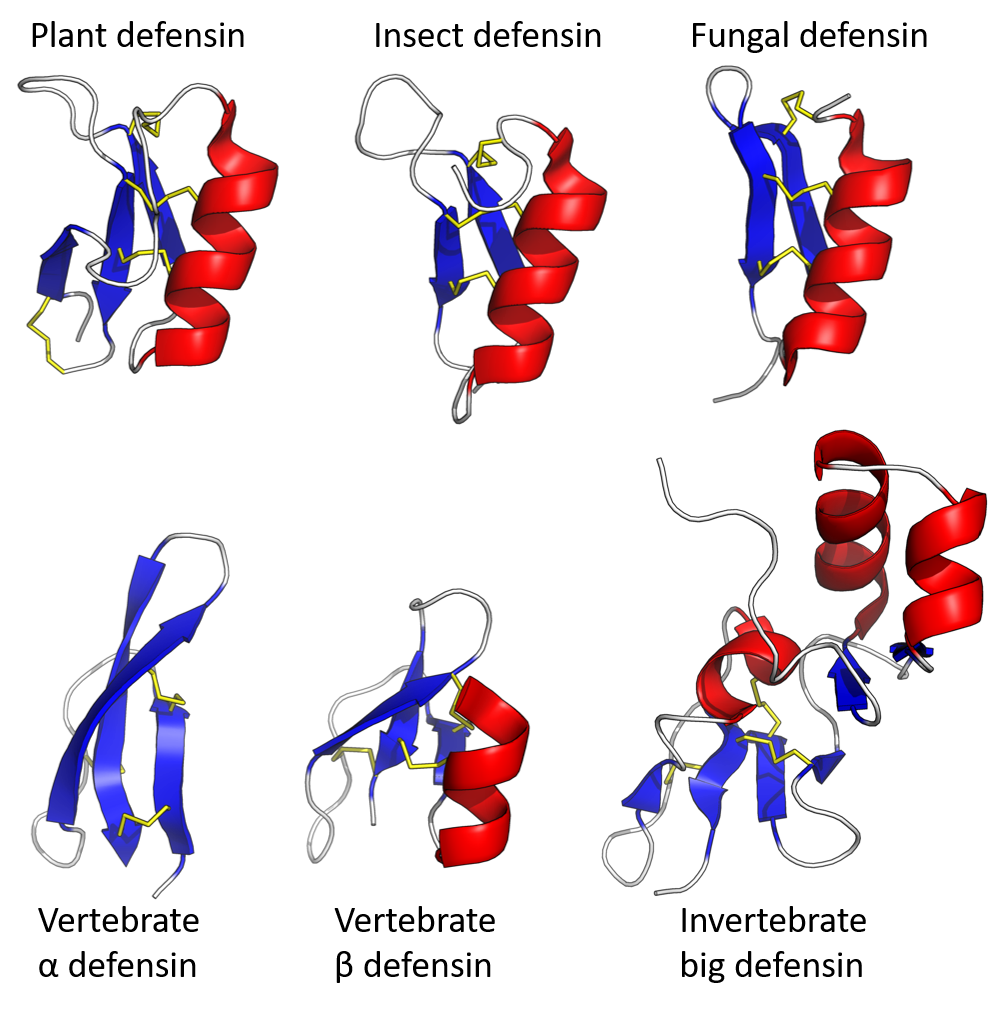
- Example defensins with alpha helix in red, beta strands in blue, disulphide bonds in yellow (PDB: 1MR4, 2KOZ, 1FJN, 2LXZ, 1IJV, 2RNG)

Identifiers
- Symbol: Defensin
- Pfam clan: CL0075
- OPM superfamily: 54
- OPM protein: 6cs9

Defensins are small cysteine-rich cationic proteins across cellular life, including vertebrate and invertebrate animals, plants, and fungi. They are host defense peptides, with members displaying either direct antimicrobial activity, immune signaling activities, or both. They are variously active against bacteria, fungi and many enveloped and nonenveloped viruses. They are typically 18-45 amino acids in length, with three or four highly conserved disulphide bonds.

In animals, they are produced by cells of the innate immune system and epithelial cells, whereas in plants and fungi they are produced by a wide variety of tissues. An organism usually produces many different defensins, some of which are stored inside the cells (e.g. in neutrophil granulocytes to kill phagocytosed bacteria), and others are secreted into the extracellular medium. For those that directly kill microbes, their mechanism of action varies from disruption of the microbial cell membrane to metabolic disruption.

== Varieties ==
Characteristic disulphide linkages

Trans-defensin superfamily: In yellow, the two most conserved disulphides link a beta strand to two different secondary structure elements (motif = CC). On the right, an example structure (PDB: 1IJV).

Cis-defensin superfamily: In yellow, the two most conserved disulphides link a beta strand to the same alpha helix (motif = CxC...CxxxC). On the right, an example structure (PDB: 1MRR4).

The name 'defensin' was coined in the mid-1980s, though the proteins have been called 'Cationic Antimicrobial Proteins,' 'Neutrophil peptides,' 'Gamma thionins' amongst others.

Proteins called 'defensins' are not all evolutionarily related to one another. Instead fall into two broad superfamilies, each of which contains multiple families. One superfamily, the trans-defensins, contains the defensins found in humans and other vertebrates, as well as some invertebrates. The other superfamily, cis-defensins, contains the defensins found in invertebrates, plants, and fungi. The superfamilies and families are determined by the overall tertiary structure, and each family usually has a conserved pattern of disulphide bonds. All defensins form small and compact folded structures, typically with a high positive charge, that are highly stable due to the multiple disulphide bonds. In all families, the underlying genes responsible for defensin production are highly polymorphic.

=== Trans-defensins ===
Vertebrate defensins are primarily α-defensins and β-defensins. Some primates additionally have the much smaller θ-defensins. In general, both α- and β-defensins are encoded by two-exon genes, where the first exon encodes for a hydrophobic leader sequence (removed after translation) and the cysteine-rich sequence (the mature peptide). The disulfide linkages formed by the cysteines have been suggested to be essential for activities related to innate immunity in mammals, but are not necessarily required for antimicrobial activity. Theta defensins form a single beta-hairpin structure and represent a distinct group. Only alpha and beta-defensins are expressed in humans.

Table of human defensins
Type	Gene Symbol	Gene Name	Protein Name	Description
α-defensins	DEFA1	Defensin, alpha 1	Neutrophil defensin 1	Are expressed primarily in neutrophils as well as in NK cells and certain T-lymphocyte subsets. DEFA5 and DEFA6 are expressed in Paneth cells of the small intestine, where they may regulate and maintain microbial balance in the intestinal lumen.
α-defensins	DEFA1B	Defensin, alpha 1B	Defensin, alpha 1	Are expressed primarily in neutrophils as well as in NK cells and certain T-lymphocyte subsets. DEFA5 and DEFA6 are expressed in Paneth cells of the small intestine, where they may regulate and maintain microbial balance in the intestinal lumen.
α-defensins	DEFA3	Defensin, alpha 3, neutrophil-specific	Neutrophil defensin 3	Are expressed primarily in neutrophils as well as in NK cells and certain T-lymphocyte subsets. DEFA5 and DEFA6 are expressed in Paneth cells of the small intestine, where they may regulate and maintain microbial balance in the intestinal lumen.
α-defensins	DEFA4	Defensin, alpha 4, corticostatin	Neutrophil defensin 4	Are expressed primarily in neutrophils as well as in NK cells and certain T-lymphocyte subsets. DEFA5 and DEFA6 are expressed in Paneth cells of the small intestine, where they may regulate and maintain microbial balance in the intestinal lumen.
α-defensins	DEFA5	Defensin, alpha 5, Paneth cell-specific	Defensin-5	Are expressed primarily in neutrophils as well as in NK cells and certain T-lymphocyte subsets. DEFA5 and DEFA6 are expressed in Paneth cells of the small intestine, where they may regulate and maintain microbial balance in the intestinal lumen.
α-defensins	DEFA6	Defensin, alpha 6, Paneth cell-specific	Defensin-6	Are expressed primarily in neutrophils as well as in NK cells and certain T-lymphocyte subsets. DEFA5 and DEFA6 are expressed in Paneth cells of the small intestine, where they may regulate and maintain microbial balance in the intestinal lumen.
β-defensins	DEFB1	Defensin, beta 1	Beta-defensin 1	Are the most widely distributed, being secreted by leukocytes and epithelial cells of many kinds. For example, they can be found on the tongue, skin, cornea, salivary glands, kidneys, esophagus, and respiratory tract. It has been suggested (but also challenged) that some of the pathology of cystic fibrosis arises from the inhibition of β-defensin activity on the epithelial surfaces of the lungs and trachea due to higher salt content.
β-defensins	DEFB2	Defensin, beta 2	Beta-defensin 2	Are the most widely distributed, being secreted by leukocytes and epithelial cells of many kinds. For example, they can be found on the tongue, skin, cornea, salivary glands, kidneys, esophagus, and respiratory tract. It has been suggested (but also challenged) that some of the pathology of cystic fibrosis arises from the inhibition of β-defensin activity on the epithelial surfaces of the lungs and trachea due to higher salt content.
β-defensins	DEFB3	Defensin, beta 3	Beta-defensin 3	Are the most widely distributed, being secreted by leukocytes and epithelial cells of many kinds. For example, they can be found on the tongue, skin, cornea, salivary glands, kidneys, esophagus, and respiratory tract. It has been suggested (but also challenged) that some of the pathology of cystic fibrosis arises from the inhibition of β-defensin activity on the epithelial surfaces of the lungs and trachea due to higher salt content.
β-defensins	DEFB103A	Defensin, beta 103B	Beta-defensin 103	Are the most widely distributed, being secreted by leukocytes and epithelial cells of many kinds. For example, they can be found on the tongue, skin, cornea, salivary glands, kidneys, esophagus, and respiratory tract. It has been suggested (but also challenged) that some of the pathology of cystic fibrosis arises from the inhibition of β-defensin activity on the epithelial surfaces of the lungs and trachea due to higher salt content.
β-defensins	^{...}	^{...}	^{...}	Are the most widely distributed, being secreted by leukocytes and epithelial cells of many kinds. For example, they can be found on the tongue, skin, cornea, salivary glands, kidneys, esophagus, and respiratory tract. It has been suggested (but also challenged) that some of the pathology of cystic fibrosis arises from the inhibition of β-defensin activity on the epithelial surfaces of the lungs and trachea due to higher salt content.
β-defensins	DEFB106A	Defensin, beta 106A	Beta-defensin 106A	Are the most widely distributed, being secreted by leukocytes and epithelial cells of many kinds. For example, they can be found on the tongue, skin, cornea, salivary glands, kidneys, esophagus, and respiratory tract. It has been suggested (but also challenged) that some of the pathology of cystic fibrosis arises from the inhibition of β-defensin activity on the epithelial surfaces of the lungs and trachea due to higher salt content.
β-defensins	DEFB106B	Defensin, beta 106B	Beta-defensin 106B	Are the most widely distributed, being secreted by leukocytes and epithelial cells of many kinds. For example, they can be found on the tongue, skin, cornea, salivary glands, kidneys, esophagus, and respiratory tract. It has been suggested (but also challenged) that some of the pathology of cystic fibrosis arises from the inhibition of β-defensin activity on the epithelial surfaces of the lungs and trachea due to higher salt content.
β-defensins	DEFB107B	Defensin, beta 107A	Beta-defensin 107	Are the most widely distributed, being secreted by leukocytes and epithelial cells of many kinds. For example, they can be found on the tongue, skin, cornea, salivary glands, kidneys, esophagus, and respiratory tract. It has been suggested (but also challenged) that some of the pathology of cystic fibrosis arises from the inhibition of β-defensin activity on the epithelial surfaces of the lungs and trachea due to higher salt content.
β-defensins	DEFB110	Defensin, beta 110	Beta-defensin 110	Are the most widely distributed, being secreted by leukocytes and epithelial cells of many kinds. For example, they can be found on the tongue, skin, cornea, salivary glands, kidneys, esophagus, and respiratory tract. It has been suggested (but also challenged) that some of the pathology of cystic fibrosis arises from the inhibition of β-defensin activity on the epithelial surfaces of the lungs and trachea due to higher salt content.
β-defensins	^{...}	^{...}	^{...}	Are the most widely distributed, being secreted by leukocytes and epithelial cells of many kinds. For example, they can be found on the tongue, skin, cornea, salivary glands, kidneys, esophagus, and respiratory tract. It has been suggested (but also challenged) that some of the pathology of cystic fibrosis arises from the inhibition of β-defensin activity on the epithelial surfaces of the lungs and trachea due to higher salt content.
β-defensins	DEFB136	Defensin, beta 136	Beta-defensin 136	Are the most widely distributed, being secreted by leukocytes and epithelial cells of many kinds. For example, they can be found on the tongue, skin, cornea, salivary glands, kidneys, esophagus, and respiratory tract. It has been suggested (but also challenged) that some of the pathology of cystic fibrosis arises from the inhibition of β-defensin activity on the epithelial surfaces of the lungs and trachea due to higher salt content.
θ-defensins	DEFT1P	Defensin, theta 1 pseudogene	not expressed in humans	Are rare, and thus far have been found only in the leukocytes of the rhesus macaque and the olive baboon, Papio anubis, the gene coding for it is corrupted in humans and other primates.

Although the most well-studied defensins are from vertebrates, a family of trans-defensins called 'big defensins' are found in molluscs, arthropods and lancelets.

=== Cis-defensins ===
Arthropod defensins are the best-characterised defensins from invertebrates (especially those from insects). Other invertebrates known to produce defensins from this protein superfamily include molluscs, annelids and cnidaria.

Plant defensins were discovered in 1990 and have subsequently been found in most plant tissues with antimicrobial activities, with both antifungal and antibacterial examples. They have been identified in all major groups of vascular plants, but not in ferns, mosses or algae.

Fungal defensins were first identified in 2005. Studied examples mainly have anti-bacterial activities and have been found in both main divisions of fungi (Ascomycota and Basidiomycota), as well as in the more basal groups of Zygomycota and Glomeromycota.

Bacterial defensins have also been identified, but are by far the least studied. They include variants with only four cysteines, whereas defensins from eukaryote defensins almost all have six or eight.

=== Related defensin-like proteins ===
In addition to the defensins involved in host defence, there are a number of related Defensin-Like Peptides (DLPs) that have evolved to have other activities.

==== Toxins ====
There appear to have been multiple evolutionary recruitments of defensins to be toxin proteins used in the venoms of animals; they act via a completely different mechanism to their antimicrobial relatives, from binding directly to ion channels to disrupting nerve signals. Examples include the crotamine toxin in snake venom, many scorpion toxins, some sea anemone toxins, and one of the toxins in platypus venom. Indeed, an insect defensin has been experimentally converted into a toxin by deletion of a small loop that otherwise sterically hindered interactions with the ion channels.

==== Signalling ====
In vertebrates, some α- and β-defensins are involved in signalling between the innate immune and adaptive immune systems. In plants, a specialised family of DLPs is involved in signalling to detect if self-pollination has occurred and induce self-incompatibility to prevent inbreeding.

==== Enzyme inhibitors ====
Some antimicrobial defensins also have enzyme inhibitory activity, and some DLPs function primarily as enzyme inhibitors, acting as antifeedants (discouraging animals from eating them).

== Function ==
In immature marsupials, because their immune system is underdeveloped at the time of birth, defensins play a major role in defense against pathogens. They are produced in the milk of the mother as well as by the young marsupial in question.

In human breast milk, defensins play a central role in neonate immunity.

The human genome contains theta-defensin genes, but they have a premature stop codon, hampering their expression. An artificial human theta-defensin, retrocyclin, was created by 'fixing' the pseudogene, and it was shown to be effective against HIV and other viruses, including herpes simplex virus and influenza A. They act primarily by preventing these viruses from entering their target cells.

Also interesting is the effect of alpha-defensins on the exotoxin produced by anthrax (Bacillus anthracis). Chun Kim et al. showed how anthrax, which produces a metalloprotease lethal factor (LF) protein to target MAPKK, is vulnerable to human neutrophil protein-1 (HNP-1). This group showed HNP-1 to behave as a reversible noncompetitive inhibitor of LF.

They have generally been considered to contribute to mucosal health; however, it is possible that these peptides can be considered biological factors that can be upregulated by bioactive compounds present in human breast milk. In this sense, the intestinal production of antimicrobial peptides as hBD2 and hBD4 by trefoil from milk might play an important role on neonate colonization, thereby enhancing the immune response of newborns against pathogens with which they may come in contact.

== Pathology ==
The alpha defensin peptides are increased in chronic inflammatory conditions.

Alpha defensin are increased in several cancers, including colorectal cancer.

An imbalance of defensins in the skin may contribute to acne.

A reduction of ileal defensins may predispose to Crohn's disease.

In one small study, a significant increase in alpha defensin levels was detected in T cell lysates of schizophrenia patients; in discordant twin pairs, unaffected twins also had an increase, although not as high as that of their ill siblings. The authors suggested that alpha-defensin levels might prove a useful marker for schizophrenia risk.

Defensins are found in the human skin during inflammatory conditions like psoriasis and also during wound healing.

== Applications ==
=== Defensins ===
At present, the widespread spread of antibiotic resistance requires the search and development of new antimicrobial drugs. From this point of view, defensins (as well as antimicrobial peptides in general) are of great interest. It was shown that defensins have pronounced antibacterial activity against a wide range of pathogens. In addition, defensins can enhance the effectiveness of conventional antibiotics.

=== Defensin-mimetics ===
Defensin mimetics, also called host defense peptide (HDP) mimetics, are completely synthetic, non-peptide, small molecule structures that mimic defensins in structure and activity. Similar molecules, such as brilacidin, are being developed as antibiotics, anti-inflammatories for oral mucositis, and antifungals, especially for candidiasis.

== See also ==
- Host defense peptides, to which defensins belong
