= Drosomycin =

Antifungal peptide

- Model of the AMP drosomycin

Identifiers
- Organism: Drosophila melanogaster
- Symbol: Drs
- Orthologs: OMA: entry
- UniProt: P41964
Search for
- Structures: Swiss-model
- Domains: InterPro

Drosomycin is an antifungal peptide from Drosophila melanogaster and was the first antifungal peptide isolated from insects. Drosomycin is induced by infection by the Toll signalling pathway, while expression in surface epithelia like the respiratory tract is instead controlled by the immune deficiency pathway (Imd). This means that drosomycin, alongside other antimicrobial peptides (AMPs) such as cecropins, diptericin, drosocin, metchnikowin and attacin, serves as a first line defence upon septic injury. However drosomycin is also expressed constitutively to a lesser extent in different tissues and throughout development.

== Structure ==
Drosomycin is a 44-residue defensin-like peptide containing four disulfide bridges. These bridges stabilize a structure involving one α-helix and three β-sheets. Owing to these four disulfide bridges, drosomycin is resistant to degradation and the action of proteases. The cysteine stabilized αβ motif of drosomycin is also found in Drosophila defensin, and some plant defensins. Drosomycin has greater sequence similarity with these plant defensins (up to 40%), than with other insect defensins. The structure was discovered in 1997 by Landon and his colleagues The αβ motif of drosomycin is also found in a scorpion neurotoxin, and drosomycin potentiates the action of this neurotoxin on nerve excitation.

== Drosomycin multigene family ==
At the nucleotide level, drosomycin is a 387 bp-long gene (Drs) which lies on Muller element 3L, very near six other drosomycin-like (Drsl) genes. These various drosomycins are referred to as the drosomycin multigene family. However, only drosomycin itself is part of the systemic immune response, while the other genes are regulated in different fashions. The antimicrobial activity of these various drosomycin-like peptides also differs. In 2015 Gao and Zhu found that in some Drosophila species (D. takahashii) some of these genes have been duplicated and this Drosophila has 11 genes in the drosomycin multigene family in total.

== Function ==
It seems that drosomycin has about three major functions on fungi, the first is partial lysis of hyphae, the second is inhibition of spore germination (in higher concentrations of drosomycin), and the last is delaying of hypha growth, which leads to hyphae branching (at lower concentrations of drosomycin). The exact mechanism of function to fungi still has to be clarified. In 2019, Hanson and colleagues generated the first drosomycin mutant, finding that indeed flies lacking drosomycin were more susceptible to fungal infection.
