= Amphibian antimicrobial peptides =

Brevenin

Identifiers
- Symbol: Brevenin
- Pfam: PF03032
- InterPro: IPR004275
- OPM superfamily: 211
- OPM protein: 2jpy
Available protein structures:
- PDB: IPR004275 PF03032 (ECOD; PDBsum)
- AlphaFold: IPR004275; PF03032

Amphibian antimicrobial peptides are a family of highly potent antimicrobial peptides with a large spectrum of activity, which are synthesized by vertebrates as an efficient host-defence mechanism against invading microorganisms. A number of these defence peptides are secreted from the skin of frogs and other amphibians, including the opiate-like dermorphins and deltorphins, and antimicrobial dermaseptins, temporins, bombinins, magainin, pseudin, bombesins, and maculatins.
