= Imd pathway =

Immune signaling pathway of insects

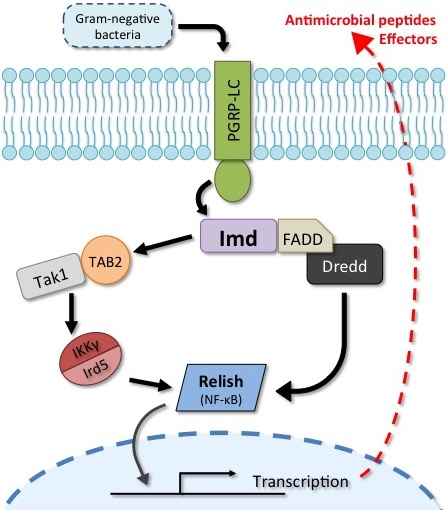
Simplified diagram of Imd signalling as found in the fruit fly.

The Imd pathway is a broadly-conserved NF-κB immune signalling pathway of insects and some arthropods that regulates a potent antibacterial defence response. The pathway is named after the discovery of a mutation causing severe immune deficiency (the gene was named "Imd" for "immune deficiency"). The Imd pathway was first discovered in 1995 using Drosophila fruit flies by Bruno Lemaitre and colleagues, who also later discovered that the Drosophila Toll gene regulated defence against Gram-positive bacteria and fungi. Together the Toll and Imd pathways have formed a paradigm of insect immune signalling; as of September 2, 2019, these two landmark discovery papers have been cited collectively over 5000 times since publication on Google Scholar.

The Imd pathway responds to signals produced by Gram-negative bacteria. Peptidoglycan recognition proteins (PGRPs) sense DAP-type peptidoglycan, which activates the Imd signalling cascade. This culminates in the translocation of the NF-κB transcription factor Relish, leading to production of antimicrobial peptides and other effectors. Insects lacking Imd signalling either naturally or by genetic manipulation are extremely susceptible to infection by a wide variety of pathogens and especially bacteria.

== Similarity to human pathways ==
The Imd pathway bears a number of similarities to mammalian TNFR signalling, though many of the intracellular regulatory proteins of Imd signalling also bear homology to different signalling cascades of human Toll-like receptors.

=== Similarity to TNFR signalling ===
The following genes are analogous or homologous between Drosophila melanogaster (in bold) and human TNFR1 signalling:

- Imd: human orthologue = RIP1
- Tak1: human orthologue = Tak1
- TAB2: human orthologue = TAB2
- Dredd: human orthologue = caspase-8
- FADD: human orthologue = FADD
- Key/Ikkγ: human orthologue = NEMO
- Ird5: human orthologue = IKK2
- Relish: human orthologues = p65/p50 and IκB
- Iap2: human orthologue = cIAP2
- UEV1a: human orthologue = UEV1a
- bend: human orthologue = UBC13

== In Drosophila ==
While the exact epistasis of Imd pathway signalling components is continually scrutinized, the mechanistic order of many key components of the pathway is well-established. The following sections discuss Imd signalling as it is found in Drosophila melanogaster, where it is exceptionally well-characterized. Imd signalling is activated by a series of steps from recognition of a bacterial substance (e.g. peptidoglycan) to the transmission of that signal leading to activation of the NF-κB transcription factor Relish. Activated Relish then forms dimers that move into the nucleus and bind to DNA leading to the transcription of antimicrobial peptides and other effectors.

=== Peptidoglycan recognition proteins (PGRPs) ===
The sensing of bacterial signals is performed by peptidoglycan recognition protein LC (PGRP-LC), a transmembrane protein with an intracellular domain. Binding of bacterial peptidoglycan leads to dimerization of PGRP-LC which generates the conformation needed to bind and activate the Imd protein. However alternate isoforms of PGRP-LC can also be expressed with different functions: PGRP-LCx recognizes polymeric peptidoglycan, while PGRP-LCa does not bind peptidoglycan directly but acts alongside PGRP-LCx to bind monomeric peptidoglycan fragments (called tracheal cytotoxin or "TCT"). Another PGRP (PGRP-LE) also acts intracellularly to bind TCT that has crossed the cell membrane or is derived from an intracellular infection. PGRP-LA promotes the activation of Imd signalling in epithelial cells, but the mechanism is still unknown.

Other PGRPs can inhibit the activation of Imd signalling by binding bacterial signals or inhibiting host signalling proteins: PGRP-LF is a transmembrane PGRP that lacks an intracellular domain and does not bind peptidoglycan. Instead PGRP-LF forms dimers with PGRP-LC preventing PGRP-LC dimerization and consequently activation of Imd signalling. A number of secreted PGRPs have amidase activity that downregulate the Imd pathway by digesting peptidoglycan into short, non-immunogenic fragments. These include PGRP-LB, PGRP-SC1A, PGRP-SC1B, and PGRP-SC2. Additionally, PGRP-LB is the major regulator in the gut.

=== Intracellular signalling components ===
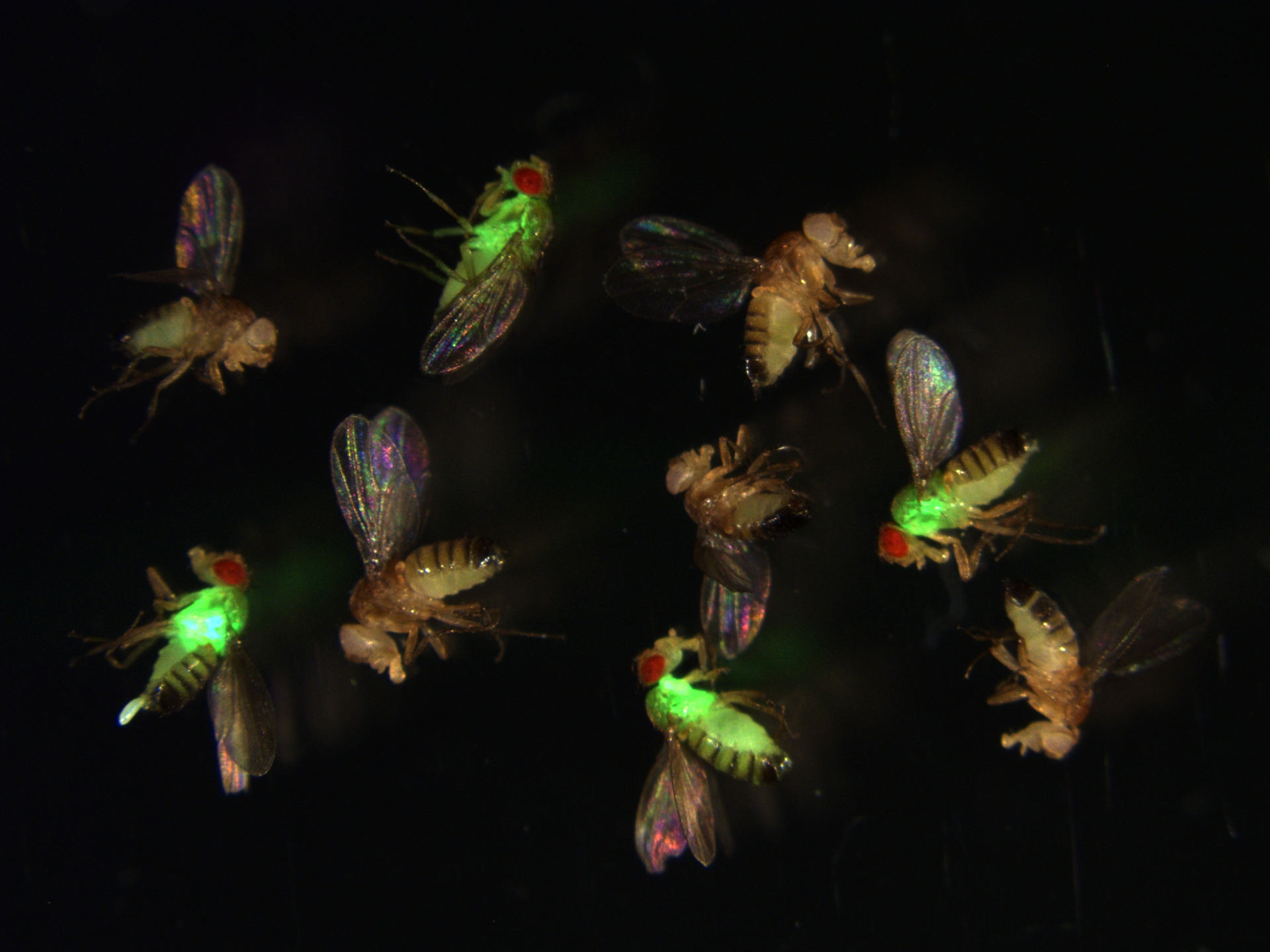
Fruit flies infected by GFP-producing bacteria. Red-eyed flies lacking antimicrobial peptide genes are susceptible to infection, while white-eyed flies have a wild-type immune response.

The principle intracellular signalling protein is Imd, a death domain-containing protein that binds with FADD and Dredd to form a complex. Dredd is activated following ubiquitination by the Iap2 complex (involving Iap2, UEV1a, bend, and eff), which allows Dredd to cleave the 30 residue N-terminus of Imd, allowing it to also be ubiquitinated by Iap2. Following this, the Tak1/TAB2 complex binds to the activated form of Imd and subsequently activates the IKKγ/Ird5 complex through phosphorylation. This IKKγ complex activates Relish by phosphorylation, leading to cleavage of Relish and thereby producing both N-terminal and C-terminal Relish fragments. The N-terminal Relish fragments dimerize leading to their translocation into the nucleus where these dimers bind to Relish-family NF-κB binding sites. Binding of Relish promotes the transcription of effectors such as antimicrobial peptides.

While Relish is integral for transcription of Imd pathway effectors, there is additional cooperation with other pathways such as Toll and JNK. The TAK1/TAB2 complex is key to propagating intracellular signalling of not only the Imd pathway, but also the JNK pathway. As a result, mutants for JNK signalling have severely reduced expression of Imd pathway antimicrobial peptides.

=== The antimicrobial response ===
Imd signalling regulates a number of effector peptides and proteins that are produced en masse following immune challenge. This includes many of the major antimicrobial peptide genes of Drosophila, particularly: Diptericin, Attacin, Drosocin, Cecropin, and Defensin. The Imd pathway regulates hundreds of genes after infection, however the antimicrobial peptides play one of the most essential roles of Imd signalling in defence. Flies lacking multiple antimicrobial peptide genes succumb to infections by a broad suite of Gram-negative bacteria. Classical thinking suggested that antimicrobial peptides worked as a generalist cocktail in defence, where each peptide provided a small and somewhat redundant contribution. However Hanson and colleagues found that single antimicrobial peptide genes displayed an unexpectedly high degree of specificity for defence against specific microbes. The fly Diptericin A gene is essential for defence against the bacterium Providencia rettgeri (also suggested by an earlier evolutionary study). A second specificity is encoded by Diptericin B, which defends flies against Acetobacter bacteria of the fly microbiome. A third specificity is encoded by the gene Drosocin. Flies lacking Drosocin are highly susceptible to Enterobacter cloacae infection. The Drosocin gene itself encodes two peptides (named Drosocin and Buletin), wherein it is specifically the Drosocin peptide that is responsible for defence against E. cloacae, while the Buletin peptide instead mediates a specific defence against another bacterium, Providencia burhodogranariea. These works accompany others on antimicrobial peptides and effectors regulated by the Drosophila Toll pathway, which also display a specific importance in defence against certain fungi or bacteria.

This work on Drosophila immune antimicrobial peptides and effectors has greatly revised the former view that such peptides are generalist molecules. The modern interpretation is now that specific molecules might provide a somewhat redundant layer of defence, but also single peptides can have critical importance, individually, against relevant microbes.

== Conservation in insects ==
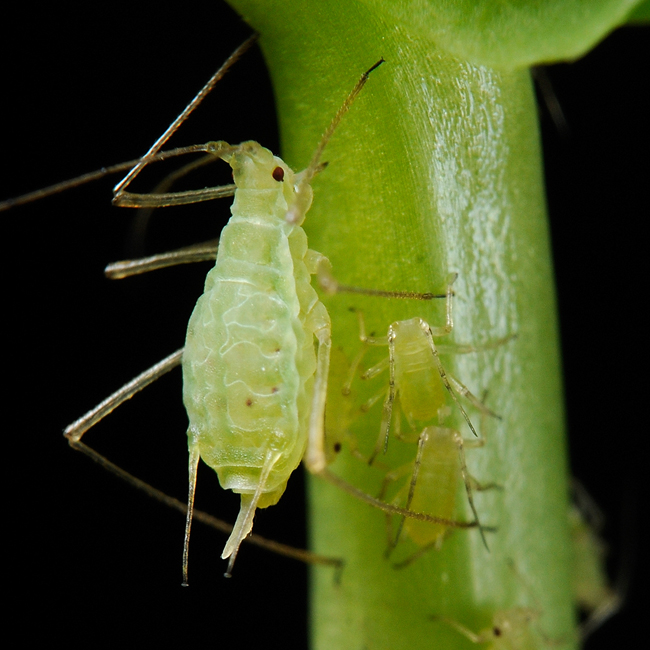
Pea aphids have lost Imd signalling

The Imd pathway appears to have evolved in the last common ancestor of centipedes and insects. However certain lineages of insects have since lost core components of Imd signalling. The first-discovered and most famous example is the pea aphid Acyrthosiphon pisum. It is thought that plant-feeding aphids have lost Imd signalling as they bear a number of bacterial endosymbionts, including both nutritional symbionts that would be disrupted by aberrant expression of antimicrobial peptides, and defensive symbionts that cover for some of the immune deficiency caused by loss of Imd signalling. It has also been suggested that antimicrobial peptides, the downstream components of Imd signalling, may be detrimental to fitness and lost by insects with exclusively plant-feeding ecologies.

=== Crosstalk between the Imd and Toll signalling pathways ===
While the Toll and Imd signalling pathways of Drosophila are commonly depicted as independent for explanatory purposes, the underlying complexity of Imd signalling involves a number of likely mechanisms wherein Imd signalling interacts with other signalling pathways including Toll and JNK. While the paradigm of Toll and Imd as largely independent provides a useful context for the study of immune signalling, the universality of this paradigm as it applies to other insects has been questioned. In Plautia stali stinkbugs, suppression of either Toll or Imd genes simultaneously leads to reduced activity of classic Toll and Imd effectors from both pathways.

=== Insects and arthropods lacking Imd signalling ===
- The pea aphid Acyrthosiphon pisum
- The bed bug Cimex lectularius
- The mite Tetranychus urticae
