= Sarcotoxin =

Peptide from flesh flies

Sarcotoxins are a group of antibacterial peptides present in the flesh fly belonging to the genus Sarcophaga. The proteins are present in the haemolymph of the flesh fly. The first protein, called sarcotoxin IA, was discovered in 1983 from Sarcophaga peregrina by Masayuki Okada and Shunji Natori at the University of Tokyo, Japan.

The name sarcotoxin is derived from the peptide's discovery in Sarcophaga flies, and so antibacterial compounds were given the name sarcotoxin and an identifying number or letter. However, many sarcotoxins are homologues of cecropins or attacins, and are not unique to Sarcophaga flies.

== See also ==
- Necrophage
- Innate immune system
