= Arenicin =

Class of peptide

Identifiers
- Symbol: undefined
- TCDB: 1.C.81
- OPM superfamily: 203
- OPM protein: 2jni

Arenicins are a group of antimicrobial peptides being studied to combat Gram-negative bacteria.

The arenicin family consists of three different peptides: arenicin-1, arenicin-2, and the most recently discovered, arencin-3.

Given the growing acquisition of multidrug resistance among bacterial pathogens, particularly in Gram-negative bacteria, the development of arenicin as a novel drug treatment has been under way. Arenicin-3 has been of particular interest in the fight against urinary tract infections caused by E. coli strains. It is also being developed with the intention of treating hospital acquired infections. In both applications, there are two proposed modes of action by which arenicin-3 interacts with the bacteria.

Adenium Biotech currently remains in the preclinical testing period of their product, arenicin-3. Toxicology, drug efficacy, and other information have yet to be determined with further research completed in clinical settings. However, with Gram-negative bacteria causing 65% of hospital-acquired infections, the commercial market for arenicin is large.

== Background (discovery and development) ==
The drug arenicin was discovered by the company Adenium Biotech, which spun off from Novozymes A/S in 2011 and was given funding support from NovoSeeds and Sunstone Life Science Ventures Fund III. The compound was initially found in secretions from the lugworm, and is part of its defense against invasive bacteria. Adenium Biotech currently holds patents for arenicin’s use against urinary tract infections. Arenicin is currently in the pre-clinical trial development phase.

== Structure ==
Arenicin-1 is composed of 21 amino acids with a beta hairpin structure. It contains one disulfide bond connecting Cys3 and Cys20, which forms its unique 18 amino acid ring.

Arenicin-2 is a 21 amino acid peptide with a beta hairpin structure in aqueous solution. It has one disulfide bond and nine hydrogen bonds, giving it a stable structure.

Arenicin-3 is a 21 amino acid peptide with the sequence GFCWYVCYRNGVRVCYRRCN. It has two disulfide bonds bridging between Cys2, Cys20 and Cys7, Cys16. In aqueous solution arenicin-3 takes on a beta hairpin structure. Due to the 4 positive arginines along with nine hydrophobic amino acids, arenicin-3 is amphipathic.

== Mode of action ==
There are currently two proposed mode of actions, but the exact mechanism is still under active research.

Cationic residues on arenicin-3 interacts with negatively charged lipopolysaccharides on the outer membrane of Gram-negative bacteria. Peptides that were translocated across the outer membrane create pores in the cytoplasmic membrane, thereby disrupting the osmotic balance of the cell. Studies showing the influx of TRITC and efflux of ATP supports this hypothesis. In addition, arenicin-3 does not seem to induce cell lysis, which is important in the avoidance of sepsis during infection.

Peptides that were translocated into the cell membrane then exert a secondary effect by inhibiting protein synthesis. It is hypothesized this mode of action is similar to that of tachyplesin I, which binds to the minor groove of DNA.

The bactericidal properties of arenicin-3 are responsible for its efficacy in inducing a 3-log reduction of E. coli bacterial load within 4 hours in a murine peritonitis model. Further experiments showed no significant inoculum effect on arenicin-3 in an E. coli survival curve experiment, improving the potential for the compound to be developed into a useful therapeutic.

== Uses ==
The arenicin family has shown to have bactericidal effects on a broad range of multi-drug resistant Gram-negative and Gram-positive bacteria in both in vitro and in vivo studies. Arenicin-3 is currently being developed as an antibiotic for hospital-acquired infections caused by Gram-negative bacteria. Hospital-acquired infections are being targeted due to their susceptibility to multi-drug resistance. In particular, Arenicin-3 is being tested for hospital-acquired pneumonia and hospital-acquired urinary tract infections.
