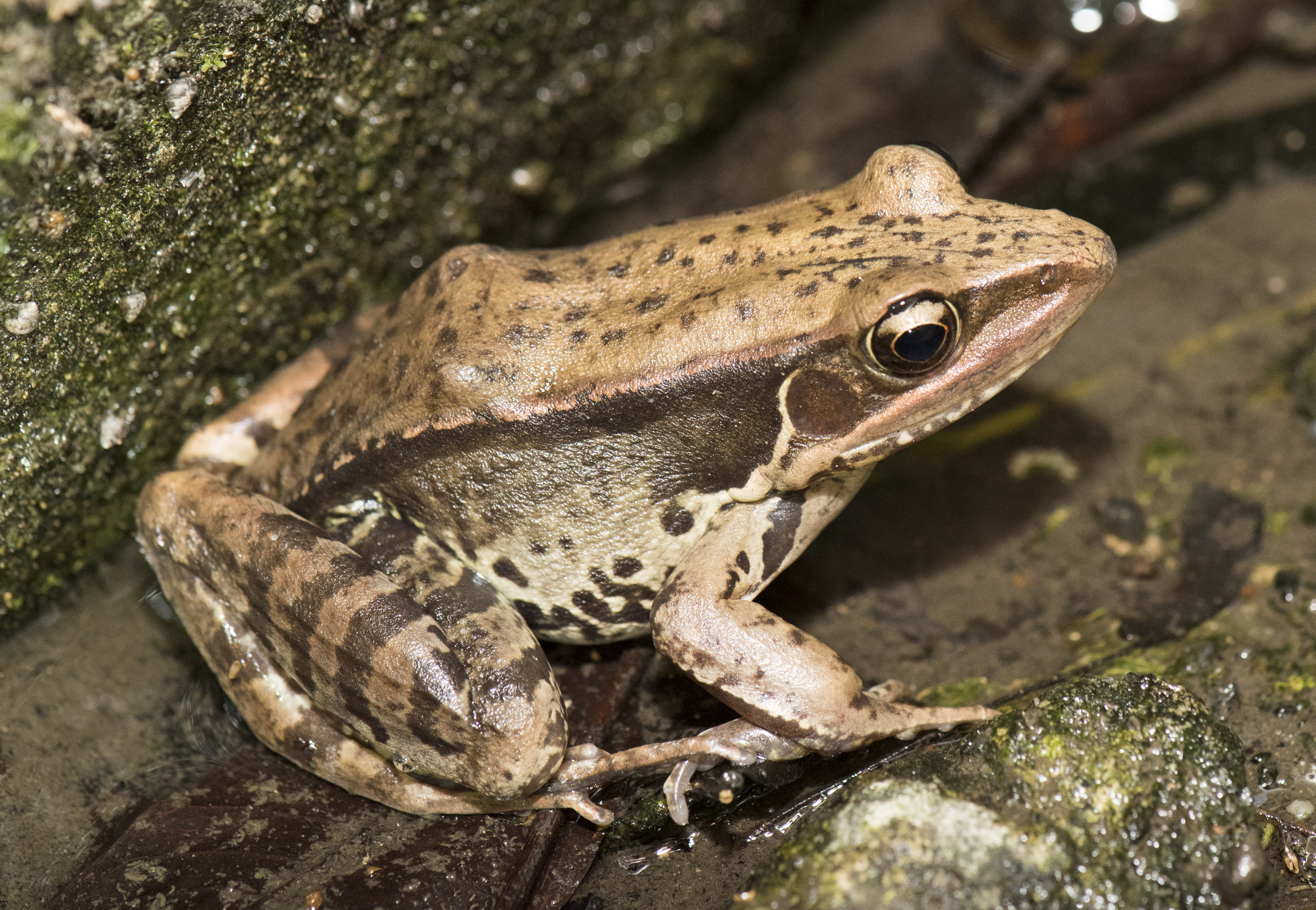
- Adult in Nantou County, Taiwan

Conservation status
- Least Concern (IUCN 3.1)

Scientific classification
- Kingdom: Animalia
- Phylum: Chordata
- Class: Amphibia
- Order: Anura
- Family: Ranidae
- Genus: Sylvirana
- Species: S. guentheri

Binomial name
- Sylvirana guentheri (Boulenger, 1882)

Synonyms
- Rana elegans Boulenger, 1882; Rana guentheri Boulenger, 1882; Hylarana guentheri Boulenger, 1882; Limnodytes elegans (Rochebrune, 1884); Hylorana güntheri (Deckert, 1938); Rana güntheri Yang, 2008; Boulengerana guentheri (Fei, Ye, and Jiang, 2010)

= Sylvirana guentheri =

Günther's frog

Species of amphibian

Hylarana guentheri (Günther's frog) is a species of frog in the family Ranidae. It was formerly placed in the genus Rana. It is found in China, Hong Kong, Macau, Taiwan, Vietnam, and possibly Cambodia and Laos. An introduced population is found on Guam. It can live as high as 1,100 metres (3,600 ft) above sea level. An alternate common name is Günther's Amoy frog, and the honorific is often spelled "Guenther's".

Its natural habitats are subtropical or tropical moist lowland forest, subtropical or tropical moist shrubland, subtropical or tropical dry lowland grassland, rivers, intermittent rivers, swamps, freshwater marshes, intermittent freshwater marshes, arable land, plantations, rural gardens, water storage areas, ponds, aquaculture ponds, irrigated land, seasonally flooded agricultural land, and canals and ditches. It is not considered a threatened species by the IUCN.

== Appearance ==
Günther's frog is a medium to large-sized frog that may grow up to 10 cm (3.9 in) in snout-vent length. The hind legs are about one and a half times as long as the body. It has vomerine teeth and a large tongue. It has a fold of skin on each side of its body, running from the eye down to the hip. This frog has a brown or yellow-brown back and a white belly.

== Life cycle ==
The female frog lays eggs in rice fields and streams with still water. The tadpole is silver-white in color and has stripes running from its nose to its eye and a dark spot behind each eye.

== Chemicals ==
This frog produces (Val1)-bradykinin in its skin to deter predators. It also produces the antibiotics guentherin, brevinin-2GHa, brevinin-2GHb, brevinin-2GHc, and temporin-GH, which also appear on its skin.

== Danger to humans ==
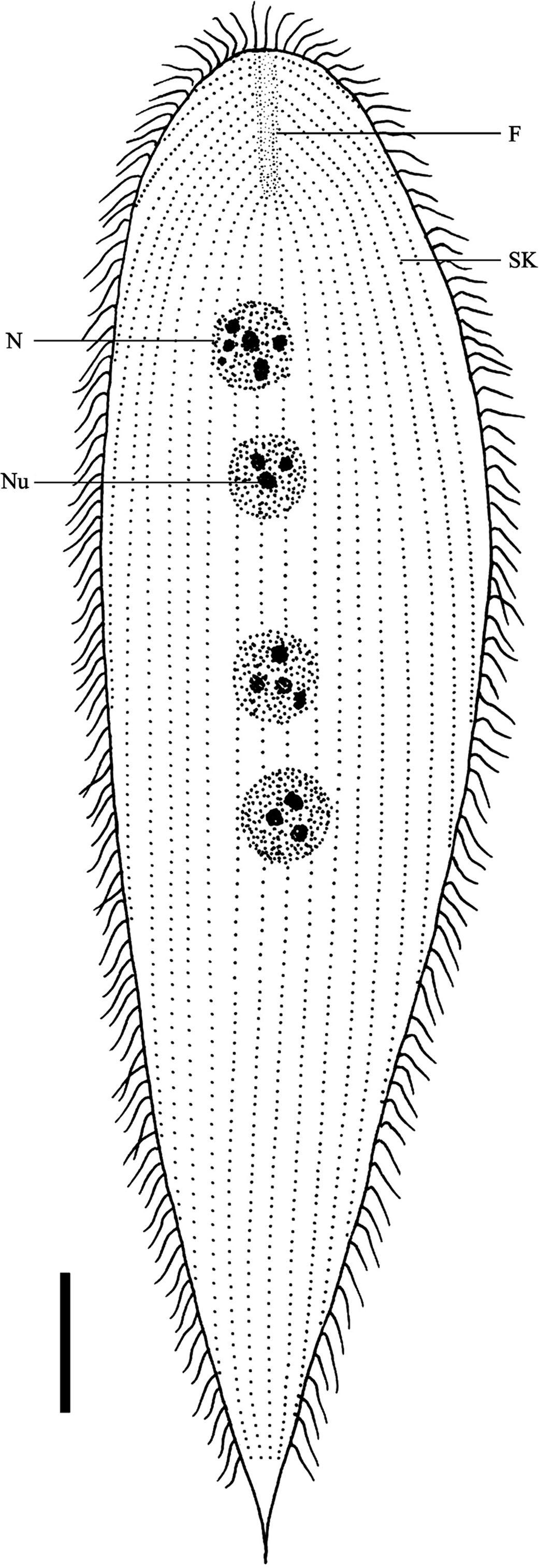
Protoopalina pingi, a parasite of the rectum of Hylarana guentheri in China

Parasites of this frog include the opalinid Protoopalina pingi, in the rectum.

This frog is also parasitized by Angiostrongylus cantonensis, or rat lungworm. In humans, this parasite causes the disease angiostrongyliasis and causes meningitis.
