= Diptericin =

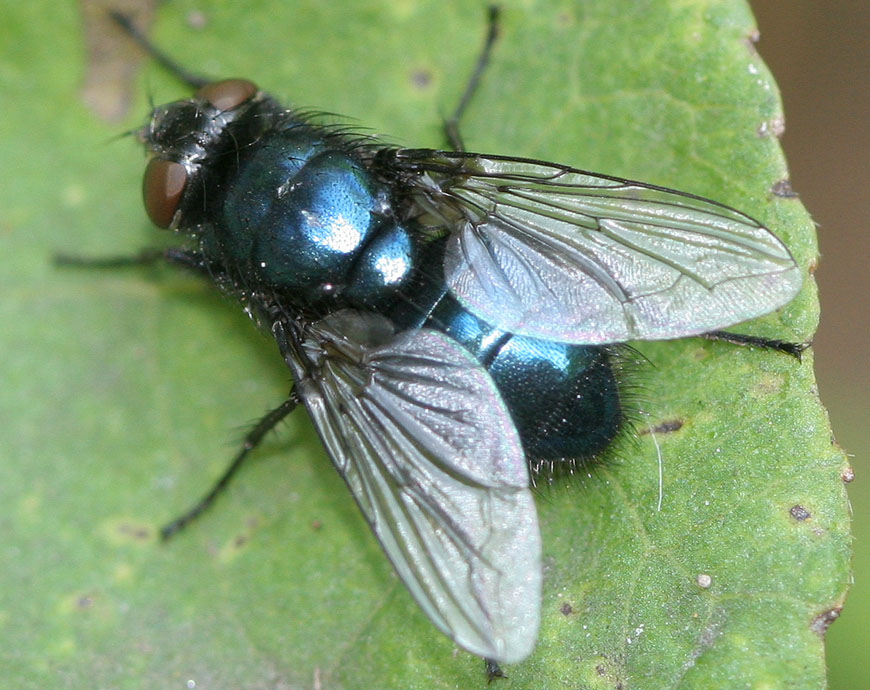
- The blowfly Phormia terranova, in which Diptericin was first isolated

Identifiers
- Symbol: Diptericin, Dpt
- InterPro: IPR040428
Available protein structures:
- PDB: IPR040428
- AlphaFold: IPR040428

Diptericin is a 9 kDa antimicrobial peptide (AMP) of flies first isolated from the blowfly Phormia terranova. It is primarily active against Gram-negative bacteria, disrupting bacterial membrane integrity. The structure of this protein includes a proline-rich domain with similarities to the AMPs drosocin, pyrrhocoricin, and abaecin, and a glycine-rich domain with similarity to attacin. Diptericin is an iconic readout of immune system activity in flies, used ubiquitously in studies of Drosophila immunity. Diptericin is named after the insect order Diptera.

== Structure and function ==
Diptericins are found throughout Diptera, but are most extensively characterized in Drosophila fruit flies. The mature structures of diptericins are unknown, though previous efforts to synthesize Diptericin have suggested Diptericin in Protophormia terraenovae is one linear peptide. Yet Drosophila melanogaster's Diptericin B peptide is likely cleaved into two separate peptides. Synthesis of Diptericin in vitro found activity of the full-length peptide, but independently synthesizing the two peptides and mixing them does not recapitulate Diptericin activity. Diptericin A activity is strongly tied to residues in the glycine-rich domain.

=== Diptericin as a model for understanding the specificity of host-pathogen interactions ===
A polymorphism at a single residue in the diptericin glycine-rich domain drastically affects its activity against the Gram-negative bacterium Providencia rettgeri. Flies with a Diptericin A gene encoding a serine allele survive infection significantly more than flies with an arginine allele. It is unclear how frequently such polymorphisms may dictate host-pathogen interactions, but there is evidence of widespread balancing selection that diptericin is not the only AMP with such polymorphisms. This close association between diptericin and P. rettgeri is further supported by genetic approaches that show that diptericin is the only antimicrobial peptide of the Drosophila immune response that affects resistance to P. rettgeri.

The fruit fly Diptericin gene "Diptericin B" has a unique structure that has been derived independently in both Tephritidae and Drosophila fruit flies. This represents convergent evolution of an antimicrobial peptide towards a common structure in two separate fruit-feeding lineages. This convergent evolution is driven by presence of Acetobacter bacteria in fruit-feeding ecologies. Absence of Acetobacter in other ecologies has led to subsequent loss of Diptericin B. Diptericin B loss is also convergent among lineages feeding on mushrooms or plants, including the mushroom-feeding fruit flies Leucophenga varia, Drosophila guttifera and Drosophila testacea, and plant-feeding Scaptomyza flies.

These observations are part of a growing body of evidence that antimicrobial peptides can have intimate associations with microbes, and perhaps host ecology, in contrast to the previous philosophy that these peptides act in generalist and redundant fashions.

== Functions beyond antimicrobial activity ==
- Diptericins can also have properties that reduce oxidative damage during the immune response.
- Suppression of the diptericin B and attacin C genes in Drosophila leads to increased Sindbis virus growth.
- Overexpression of diptericin and other antimicrobial peptides in the brains of flies leads to neurodegeneration.
- The Drosophila diptericin B gene is required for memory formation.
