= Moricin =

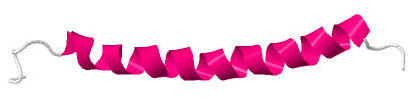
- Solution structure of antibacterial peptide (moricin)

Identifiers
- Symbol: Moricin
- Pfam: PF06451
- InterPro: IPR009456
- SCOP2: 1kv4 / SCOPe / SUPFAM
- OPM superfamily: 151
- OPM protein: 1kv4
Available protein structures:
- PDB: IPR009456 PF06451 (ECOD; PDBsum)
- AlphaFold: IPR009456; PF06451

Moricin is a highly basic antibacterial peptide that was isolated from the silkworm Bombyx mori. It consists of a long alpha-helix with 8 turns from a 42 amino acid sequence over almost the entire protein. The amphipathic N-terminal segment of the alpha- helix is mainly responsible for the increase in permeability of the bacterial membrane which kills the bacteria. Moricin functions as an antibacterial peptide against Gram-positive and Gram-negative bacteria, with its main activity being towards Gram-positive bacteria.
