= Liver-expressed antimicrobial peptide =

LEAP2

Identifiers
- Symbol: LEAP2
- Pfam: PF07359
- InterPro: IPR009955
- OPM superfamily: 276
- OPM protein: 2l1q
Available protein structures:
- PDB: IPR009955 PF07359 (ECOD; PDBsum)
- AlphaFold: IPR009955; PF07359

Liver-expressed antimicrobial peptides are a family of mammalian liver-expressed antimicrobial peptides (LEAP). The exact function of this family is unclear.

LEAP2 is a cysteine-rich, and cationic protein with a core structure stabilized by two disulphide bonds formed by cysteine residues in 1-3 and 2-4 relative positions. Synthesised as a 77-residue precursor, LEAP2 is predominantly expressed in the liver and highly conserved among mammals. The largest native LEAP2 form of 40 amino acid residues is generated from the precursor at a putative cleavage site for a furin-like endoprotease. In contrast to smaller LEAP-2 variants, this peptide exhibits dose-dependent antimicrobial activity against selected microbial model organisms.
