= Sarcophaga peregrina =

Scientific classification
- Kingdom: Animalia
- Phylum: Arthropoda
- Clade: Pancrustacea
- Class: Insecta
- Order: Diptera
- Family: Sarcophagidae
- Subfamily: Sarcophaginae
- Genus: Sarcophaga
- Species: S. peregrina

Binomial name
- Sarcophaga peregrina Robineau-Desvoidy, 1830

Synonyms
- Boettcherisca peregrina Rohdendorf, 1937; Myophora peregrina Robineau-Desvoidy, 1830

Species of fly

Sarcophaga peregrina (synonym Boettcherisca peregrina) is a species of flesh fly belonging to the family Sarcophagidae. They easily breed, multiply and spread in human habitation, from garbage, faeces and livestock manures. In many regions, they are health concerns as they are active vectors of infectious diseases such as myiasis in humans. Due to their close contact with human activities, they are considered as forensically important insects. They can be used for molecular analysis of the time of postmortem intervals. They are also occasionally parasitic in other invertebrates. They produce a group of antibacterial peptide called sarcotoxins. The first of such protein, sarcotoxin 1A, was determined in 1983 by Masayuki Okada and Shunji Natori at the University of Tokyo, Japan.

== Distribution ==
Sarcophaga peregrina has been reported in Southeast Asian region from Sri Lanka to Indonesia, China, Japan, Australia, Samoa and Cook Islands, Hawaii, and throughout Europe. They are usually the most abundant fly in these regions as they rapidly breed in chicken manure, and also on foods and excrement around human habitations.

== Description ==
Sarcophaga peregrina looks like normal flies, and are often difficult to identify easily. The average body length is 8–11 mm. The body colour is grey with black markings. The lower part of the head is silver-grey. The thorax is entirely grey with a characteristic three black stripes, which is marked along the longitudinal body axis. The abdomen is also grey with black stripes; one longitudinal line in the middle and three big transverse lines across. The first of the abdominal stripe is somewhat V-shaped. The wings are transparent. An important microscopical diagnosis is the presence of 5-20 long slender hairs (absent in most species of flesh fly) on propleura - a deepset plate on the antero-lateral corner of the thorax adjacent to the lower part of the spiracle. The larvae are characterised by having twelve segments, each with short spines at its posterior margin. The posterior end is broader and the anterior tapering with the anterior end having two oral hooks and mouth brushes.

== Pathogenicity ==
Sarcophaga peregrina easily breed and multiply where there are garbage (especially having meat), human and animal faeces, and fish baits. Thus their close human contact often results in their infection. They are known to deposit their larvae in the wounds and scratches on skin in humans. As such their larvae have been reported to cause oral and nasal myiasis. In 1987 a clinical case of first human intestinal myasis was reported from a Japanese patient. The live larvae were easily identified from the stool sample. They also infect some species of earthworm and locust.

== Application ==
Sarcophaga peregrina will rapidly swarm corpse cadavers, and for this reason they can be used as important indications of the postmortem interval in forensic investigations. Especially with molecular techniques, such as identifying cytochrome oxidase (COI) and 16S rDNA genes, they can be identified from other flies even when the corpse is infested with different species. Then the age of the flies can be specifically determined, using technique such as pteridine fluorescence, and this helps to establish the time of death.
