= Indolicidin =

Names
- IUPAC name (2S)-1-[(2S)-2-[[(2S)-6-amino-2-[[(2S)-2-[[(2S)-1-[(2S)-2-[[(2S,3S)-2-amino-3-methylpentanoyl]amino]-4-methylpentanoyl]pyrrolidine-2-carbonyl]amino]-3-(1H-indol-3-yl)propanoyl]amino]hexanoyl]amino]-3-(1H-indol-3-yl)propanoyl]-N-[(2S)-1-[[(2S)-1-[(2S)-2-[[(2S)-1-[[(2S)-1-[[(2S)-1-amino-5-carbamimidamido-1-oxopentan-2-yl]amino]-5-carbamimidamido-1-oxopentan-2-yl]amino]-3-(1H-indol-3-yl)-1-oxopropan-2-yl]carbamoyl]pyrrolidin-1-yl]-3-(1H-indol-3-yl)-1-oxopropan-2-yl]amino]-3-(1H-indol-3-yl)-1-oxopropan-2-yl]pyrrolidine-2-carboxamide

Identifiers
CAS Number	140896-21-5
3D model (JSmol)	Interactive image
ChEMBL	ChEMBL415216
ChemSpider	17286525
PubChem CID	16129733
UNII	073SBV429N
CompTox Dashboard (EPA)	DTXSID2040866
- InChI: InChI=1S/C100H132N26O13/c1-5-57(4)85(102)95(136)123-79(45-56(2)3)96(137)124-42-20-36-82(124)92(133)118-76(46-58-51-110-68-28-11-6-23-63(58)68)89(130)116-74(33-16-17-39-101)88(129)121-80(49-61-54-113-71-31-14-9-26-66(61)71)97(138)125-43-21-38-84(125)94(135)120-78(48-60-53-112-70-30-13-8-25-65(60)70)91(132)122-81(50-62-55-114-72-32-15-10-27-67(62)72)98(139)126-44-22-37-83(126)93(134)119-77(47-59-52-111-69-29-12-7-24-64(59)69)90(131)117-75(35-19-41-109-100(106)107)87(128)115-73(86(103)127)34-18-40-108-99(104)105/h6-15,23-32,51-57,73-85,110-114H,5,16-22,33-50,101-102H2,1-4H3,(H2,103,127)(H,115,128)(H,116,130)(H,117,131)(H,118,133)(H,119,134)(H,120,135)(H,121,129)(H,122,132)(H,123,136)(H4,104,105,108)(H4,106,107,109)/t57-,73-,74-,75-,76-,77-,78-,79-,80-,81-,82-,83-,84-,85-/m0/s1 Key: USSYUMHVHQSYNA-SLDJZXPVSA-N
- SMILES: CC[C@H](C)[C@@H](C(=O)N[C@@H](CC(C)C)C(=O)N1CCC[C@H]1C(=O)N[C@@H](CC2=CNC3=CC=CC=C32)C(=O)N[C@@H](CCCCN)C(=O)N[C@@H](CC4=CNC5=CC=CC=C54)C(=O)N6CCC[C@H]6C(=O)N[C@@H](CC7=CNC8=CC=CC=C87)C(=O)N[C@@H](CC9=CNC1=CC=CC=C19)C(=O)N1CCC[C@H]1C(=O)N[C@@H](CC1=CNC2=CC=CC=C21)C(=O)N[C@@H](CCCNC(=N)N)C(=O)N[C@@H](CCCNC(=N)N)C(=O)N)N

Properties
Chemical formula	C_{100}H_{132}N_{26}O_{13}
Molar mass	1906.325 g·mol^{−1}
- Except where otherwise noted, data are given for materials in their standard state (at 25 °C [77 °F], 100 kPa). Infobox references

Indolicidin is an antimicrobial peptide isolated from neutrophil blood cells of cows. The mature peptide is just 13 amino acids, making it one of the smallest antimicrobial peptides known to be encoded as the primary product of the encoding antimicrobial peptide gene. Indolicidin is active against bacterial pathogens, but has also been shown to kill fungi and even HIV virus.
