= Structurally nanoengineered antimicrobial polypeptide polymers =

Structurally nanoengineered antimicrobial polypeptide polymers (SNAPPs) are a type of artificially designed synthetic antimicrobial peptide. The development of the polymers is potentially a treatment for bacterial diseases. The research takes a novel approach to combating bacteria; rather than poisoning them as antibiotics do, SNAPPs and other antimicrobial peptides tear the bacteria apart.

== Structure and characteristics ==
The molecule destabilizes the structure of the outer membrane and cytoplasmic membrane in multi-drug resistant gram-negative bacteria with no resistance observed by the researchers through multiple bacterial generations. While no human trials have been approved yet, the molecule has been tested in vivo with the mouse peritonitis model, and was shown to be highly selective towards bacterial cell walls, leaving mammalian cells unharmed. Bacteria species tested include E. coli and K. pneumoniae, along with variants of P. aeruginosa and A. baumannii. SNAPPs work by literally tearing the cell wall and cytoplasmic membrane apart, leading to cell death. Their structure physically resembles a star. At the core of their structure is a multi-functional initiator poly(amidoamine) with 16 or 32 primary amines. Lysine and valine amino acids are polymerized to the N-terminus of the core in order to form either an S16 (16 arm SNAPP) or S32 (32 arm SNAPP). The polymerized peptide chains result in several positively charged primary ammonium cations, which help adhere the negatively charged end of the phospholipid bi-layer.
