= Protegrin =

Identifiers
- Symbol: N/A
- OPM superfamily: 203
- OPM protein: 1pg1

Protegrins are small peptides containing 16-18 amino acid residues. Protegrins were first discovered in porcine leukocytes and were found to have antimicrobial activity against bacteria, fungi, and some enveloped viruses. The amino acid composition of protegrins contains six positively charged arginine residues and four cysteine residues. Their secondary structure is classified as cysteine-rich β-sheet antimicrobial peptides, AMPs, that display limited sequence similarity to certain defensins and tachyplesins. In solution, the peptides fold to form an anti-parallel β-strand with the structure stabilized by two cysteine bridges formed among the four cysteine residues. Recent studies suggest that protegrins can bind to lipopolysaccharide, a property that may help them to insert into the membranes of gram-negative bacteria and permeabilize them.

== Structure ==
There are five known porcine protegrins, PG-1 to PG-5. Three were identified biochemically and rest of them were deduced from DNA sequences.

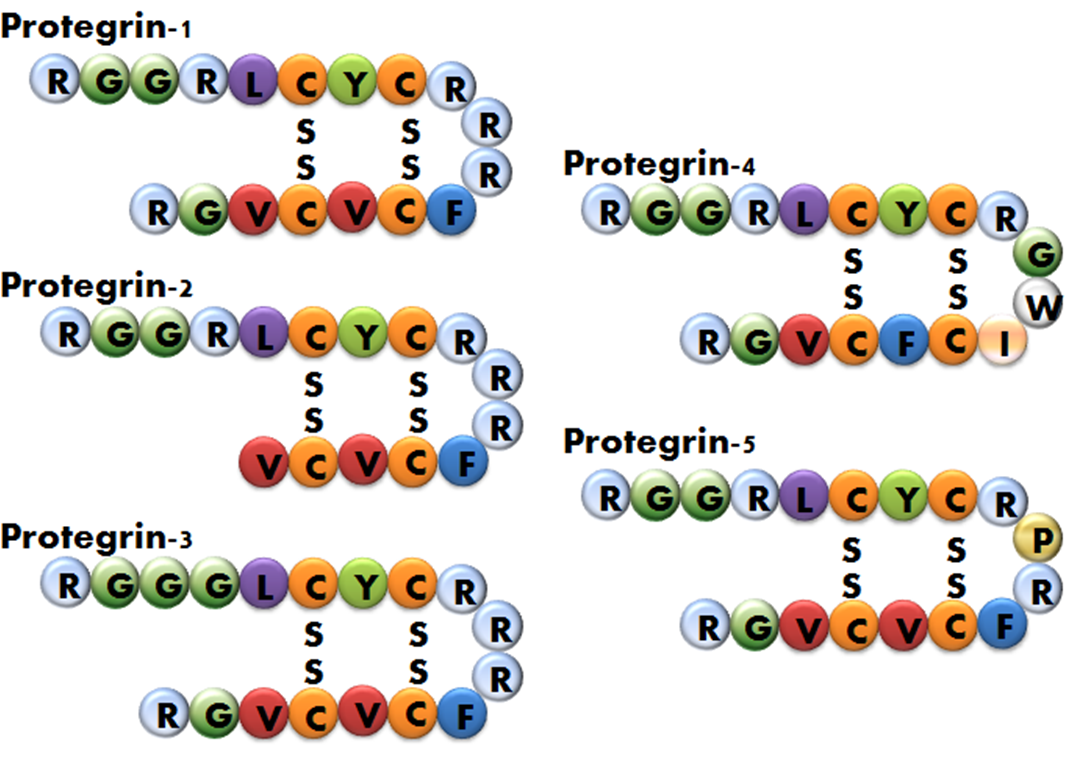
Protegrin structures

The protegrins are synthesized from quadripartite genes as 147 to 149 amino acid precursors with a cathelin-like propiece. Protegrin sequence is similar to certain prodefensins and tachyplesins, antibiotic peptides derived from the horseshoe crab. Protegrin-1 that consists of 18 amino acids, six of which are arginine residues, forms two antiparallel β-sheets with a β-turn. Protegrin-2 is missing two carboxy terminal amino acids. So, Protegrin-2 is shorter than Protegrin-1 and it has one less positive charge. Protegrin-3 substitutes a glycine for an arginine at position 4 and it also has one less positive charge. Protegrin-4 substitutes a phenylalanine for a valine at position 14 and sequences are different in the β-turn. This difference makes protegrin-4 less polar than others and less positively charged. Protegrin-5 substitutes a proline for an arginine with one less positive charge.

== Mechanism of action ==
Protegrin-1 induces membrane disruption by forming a pore/channel that leads to cell death. This ability depends on its secondary structure. It forms an oligomeric structure in the membrane that creates a pore. Two ways of the self association of protegrin-1 into a dimeric β-sheet, an antiparallel β-sheet with a turn-next-to-tail association or a parallel β-sheet with a turn-next-to-turn association, were suggested. The activity can be restored by stabilizing the peptide structure with the two disulfide bonds. The interacts with membranes depends on membrane lipid composition and the cationic nature of the protegrin-1 adapts to the amphipathic characteristic which is related to the membrane interaction. The insertion of Protegrin-1 into the lipid layer results in the disordering of lipid packing to the membrane disruption.

== Antimicrobial activity ==
The protegrins are highly microbicidal against Candida albicans, Escherichia coli, Listeria monocytogenes, Neisseria gonorrhoeae, and the virions of the human immunodeficiency virus in vitro under conditions which mimic the tonicity of the extracellular milieu. The mechanism of this microbicidal activity is believed to involve membrane disruption, similar to many other antibiotic peptides

== Mimetics as antibiotics ==
Protegrin-1 (PG-1) peptidomimetics developed by Polyphor AG and the University of Zurich are based on the use of the beta hairpin-stabilizing D-Pro-L-Pro template which promote a beta hairpin loop structure found in PG-I. Fully synthetic cyclic peptide libraries of this peptidomimetic template produced compounds that had an antimicrobial activity like that of PG-1 but with reduced hemolytic activity on human red blood cells. Iterative rounds of synthesis and optimization led to the pseudomonas-specific clinical candidate Murepavadin that successfully completed phase-II clinical tests in hospital patients with life-threatening Pseudomonas lung infections.
