= Pyrrhocoricin =

Peptide

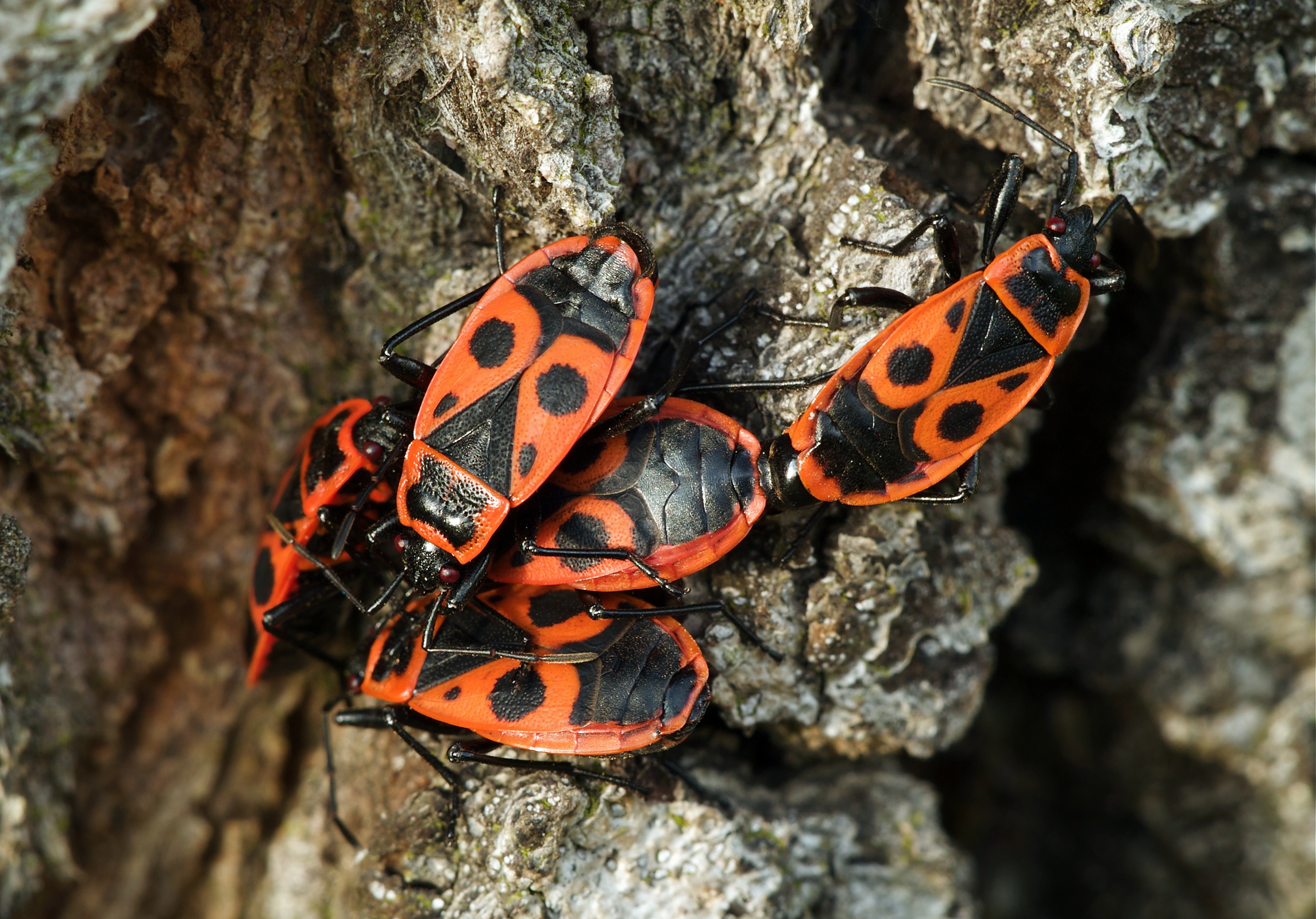
- The firebug Pyrrhocoris apterus

Identifiers
- Symbol: ?
- CAS number: 224569-84-0
- PDB: 5FDV
- UniProt: P37362
Search for
- Structures: Swiss-model
- Domains: InterPro

Pyrrhocoricin is a 20-residue long antimicrobial peptide of the firebug Pyrrhocoris apterus.

== Structure and function ==
Pyrrhocoricin is primarily active against Gram-negative bacteria. The peptide is proline-rich with proline-arginine repeats, as well a critical threonine residue, which is required for activity through O-glycosylation. Like the antimicrobial peptides drosocin and abaecin, pyrrhocoricin binds to the bacterial protein DnaK, inhibiting cell machinery and replication. Only the L-enantiomer of pyrrhocoricin is active against bacteria. The action of pyrrhocoricin-like peptides is potentiated by the presence of pore-forming peptides, which facilitates the entry of pyrrhocoricin-like peptides into the bacterial cell. Proline-rich peptides like Pyrrhocoricin can also bind to microbe ribosomes, preventing protein translation. In the absence of pore-forming peptides, pyrrhocoricin is taken into the bacteria by the action of bacterial uptake permeases.
