= Thioester-containing protein 1 =

Key component of arthropod innate immune system

Identifiers
- Organism: Anopheles gambia
- Symbol: TEP1
- Entrez: 2828233
- RefSeq (Prot): NP_523578.1
- UniProt: B5AZK7
Search for
- Structures: Swiss-model
- Domains: InterPro

Thioester containing protein 1, often called TEP1 is a key component of the arthropod innate immune system. TEP1 was first identified as a key immunity gene in 2001 through functional studies on Anopheles gambiae mosquitoes.

TEP1 is an antimicrobial protein which acts in a system reminiscent of the human complement pathway, which damages the cell membranes of pathogens. Studies have shown that TEP1 is structurally and functionally homologous to the human complement protein C3. TEP1 is now known to be important in the resistance of Anopheles mosquitoes to Plasmodium infection, targeting the malaria parasite during its invasion into the mosquitoes body cavity. Following this discovery insect thioester containing proteins have come under increased scrutiny from the scientific community as possible targets for disease control.

TEP1 is coded for by two different alleles TEP1-S and TEP-R which are specific to susceptible and resistant mosquito populations respectively.

== Structure ==
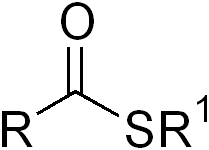
Schematic of thioester bond: TEP1 contains a highly conserved thioester which enables the covalent labelling of parasites.

Several crystallography studies have been used to determine the structure of TEP1. TEP1 contains a highly reactive thioester motif, which can undergo spontaneous hydrolysis. The thioester group is functionally essential for TEP1 to covalently bind to the surface of invading pathogens. Tep1 is a multimeric protein, meaning it is formed of multiple associated polypeptide chains. TEP1 is composed of a series of 6 macroglobulin domains, a β sheet CUB domain and an essential thioester domain, which protects the thioester motif from premature activation and hydrolysis by shielding it in the core of the molecule.

Comparisons of the TEP1-S and TEP1-R gene products show that the two allelic variants encode structural differences which are particularly prevalent in the thioester domain. These differences alter both the stability of the thioester bond and the ability of TEP1 to interact with other factors in the hemolymph of the mosquito.

=== C3 homology ===
The structure of TEP1 and its vertebrate homologue - complement protein C3- is mostly conserved. However, there are some differences between the two molecules, for example unlike C3, TEP1 lacks an anaphylatoxin domain. The absence of this domain means that the exposed thioester bond of active TEP1 is unstable.

=== Maturation ===
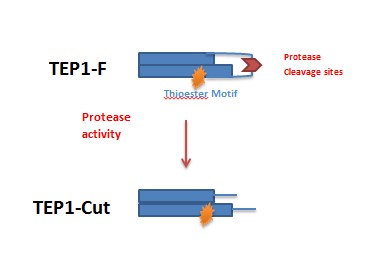
TEP1 Maturation: TEP1-F is cleaved into TEP1-Cut.

The TEP1 protein is glycosylated and secreted into the body cavity by mosquito immune cells as a 165 kDa zymogen - this inactivated form is known as TEP1-F. Upon parasite infection TEP1-F is cleaved. A protease processes the full length molecule into two fragments which remain closely associated: a ~75 kDa N-terminal and an ~85 kDa C-terminal fragment which contains the thioester bond. The cleaved protein is known as TEP1-cut and represents the activated form. This mechanism is equivalent to the maturation of vertebrate pro-C3 to active C3 which occurs in the endoplasmic reticulum.

Recent work has suggested the two forms of TEP1, the full TEP1-F and TEP1-cut, have separate roles.

== Function ==
TEP1 is a central component in the mosquito's immune response against invading parasites such as Plasmodium. Similar to the complement protein C3 in function, TEP1 acts as an opsonin which facilitates extensive parasite killing. TEP1 covalently binds to the surface of invading pathogens, promoting phagocytosis, lysis and melanisation. Through this activity TEP1 is considered an important determinant of Anopheles vector capacity. TEP1 is an antimicrobial peptide which associates with APL1C/LRIM1 heterodimers to act as a pattern recognition receptor (PRR) which identifies and responds to specific patterns on pathogen cell surfaces.

Studies have shown TEP1 to be a key molecule in limiting parasite numbers in mosquitoes. RNA interference (RNAi) experiments have illustrated the importance of TEP1 in clearing malaria infections in mosquitoes. RNAi knockdown of TEP1 using dsRNA resulted in a five-fold increase of Plasmodium oocysts in TEP1-S silenced mosquitoes. Knock down of TEP1-R stops parasite melanisation.

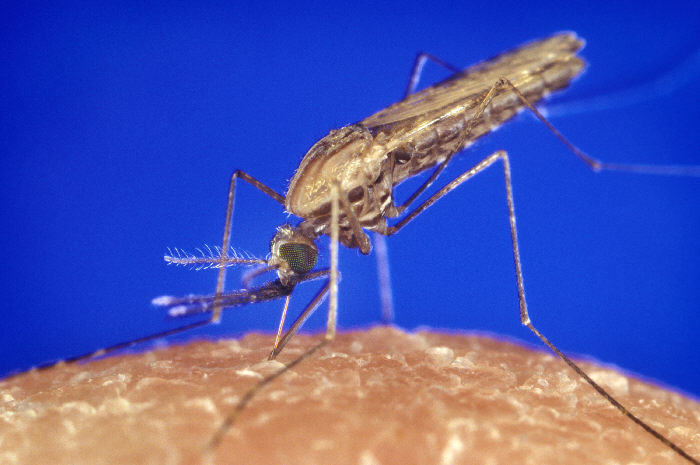
Anopheles gambiae mosquito : TEP1 is a key protein in the mosquito immune response against malarial parasites

=== Activation ===
TEP1-F is secreted into the hemolymph where it is processed by a currently unknown protease into its active form – the two chained molecule TEP1-Cut. Cleavage into the cut form is followed by a change in protein structure which exposes the thioester bond. This conformational change enables TEP1 to react and covalently bind to molecules on the surface of invading pathogens.

=== Regulation ===
The expression of TEP1 and other genes involved in the mosquito's anti-parasitic response is a highly regulated process. The base level of TEP1 expression is regulated by insect Toll and IMD pathways. These immune pathways limit the expression of TEP1 coding genes through NF-kB/ REL transcription factors. TEP1 interacts with a heterodimeric protein complex made up of two leucine-rich repeat (LRR) domain containing proteins: leucine-rich immune molecule 1 (LRIM1) and Anopheles Plasmodium-responsive leucine-rich repeat protein 1 (APL1C). The LRR molecules have two main roles: firstly acting as control proteins which prevent the inactivation of TEP1 through hydrolysis of the thioester bond or binding to self -tissues and secondly mediate the binding of TEP1 to pathogen surfaces.

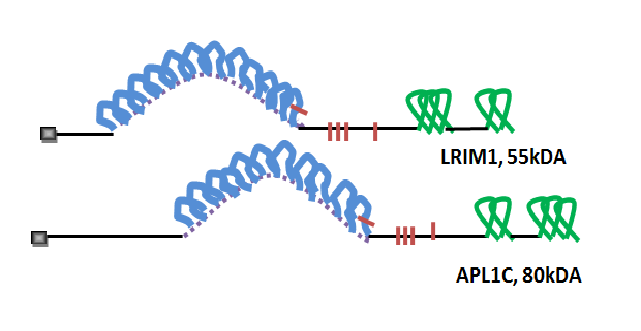
Schematic illustrating the basic structures of LRIM1 and APl1C.

The LRIM1/APL1C heterodimer has three domains, combining the elements of a N-terminal LRR region, a pattern of cysteine residues and a C-terminal coiled-coil domain. These features determine how the complex interacts with TEP1.

== Complement pathway activity ==
The complement system was previously thought to be an exclusive feature of the immune defense of vertebrates until complement-like molecules were cloned in non-vertebrate species such as the horseshoe crab and mosquitoes. The discovery of C3 like molecules in a diverse range of species suggests that the complement pathway in particular the alternative complement pathway is evolutionary ancient. The TEP1 cascade most closely resembles the alternative pathway as insects do not possess adaptive immunity. Therefore, unlike the classical complement pathway the TEP1 pathway is antibody independent and instead relies on the presence of factors permanently present at low levels in the hemolymph. Furthermore, both the TEP1 pathway and the alternative pathway utilise convertase mediated amplification loops to increase pathogen opsonisation.

=== Convergent evolution ===
Thioester containing protein (TEPs) appeared early in animal evolution: members of this family have been identified in diverse organisms as nematodes, insects, molluscs, fish, birds and mammals. TEP1 in Anopheles gambiae is one of the best studied of these molecules. Despite close structural and functional similarities, phylogenic analysis has shown that TEP1 and other arthropod thioester proteins actually form a separate clade from vertebrate complement factors. This data suggests that their complement-like activity is a likely example of parallel evolution. Further research is needed into this area.

== Potential use in malaria control ==
The characterization of TEP1 and other similar insect immune factors in insects represent new opportunities to prevent the transmission of insect vector borne diseases. Research is currently focusing on vector/parasite interactions, specifically those between Plasmodium and Anopheles mosquitoes, in order to discover novel, improved malaria prevention methods. TEP1 is being explored as a possible target for genetic manipulation. A significant aim of this research is to create mosquito populations resistant to Plasmodium parasites therefore reducing the spread of malaria.
