= Magainin =

Group of pore-formng peptides from the skin and intestines of frogs

Identifiers
- Symbol: Magainin
- TCDB: 1.C.16
- OPM superfamily: 211
- OPM protein: 2mag

The magainins are a class of antimicrobial peptides found in the African clawed frog (Xenopus laevis). The peptides are cationic, generally lack a stable conformation in water but form amphipathic α-helix in membranes; their mechanism against micro-organisms is unclear but they disrupt the cell membranes of a broad spectrum of bacteria, protozoa, and fungi.

They were independently discovered at around the same time by the labs of Michael Zasloff at the NIH and Dudley H. Williams at the University of Cambridge. They were named by Zasloff, after the Hebrew word for "shield," מגן māgēn (Ashkenazi pronunciation: magain).

Zasloff helped found a company, Magainin Pharmaceuticals (subsequently called Genaera) to develop magainins into drugs. One candidate was an analog of magainin called pexiganan (MSI-78) that the company developed as a topical agent for infected diabetic foot ulcers; in 1999 the FDA rejected the application because pexiganan was not better than standard treatments. Another company, Dipexium Pharmaceuticals, ran further phase III clinical trials for the same use, which failed in 2016.
