= Temporins =

Frog peptides

Temporins are a family of peptides isolated originally from the skin secretion of the European red frog, Rana temporaria. Peptides belonging to the temporin family have been isolated also from closely related North American frogs, such as Rana sphenocephala.

== Discovery ==
In 1996, the skin of the Rana temporaria was screened into a cDNA library, discovering three peptide precursors, known as Temporin B, Temporin G, and Temporin H. Once discovered, the three peptide, along with other temporins found in the sample, were separated from secretions of the frog's skin. Biological assays were performed, revealing that all temporins, in exception of temporin D and H, exhibited antibacterial activity. It was soon discovered that other species of frog also possess temporal, resulting in the discovery of more than 150 peptides from the temporin family. Some of the genera of frogs include the Amolops, Hylarana, Lithobathes, Odorrana, Pelophylax, Rana, and Hylarana.

== Clinical uses ==
Temporins are a family of antimicrobial peptides (AMPs), which are highly targetable toward Gram-positive bacteria, allowing it to penetrate the cell wall and damage the inner membrane of the bacteria. These proteins are also capable of killing specific cancer cells when they are locally administered to a tumor, making it a good anticancer drug.
