= Tachyplesin =

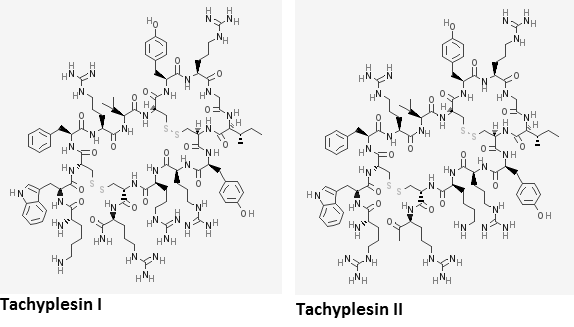
Tachyplesin I and Tachyplesin II

Tachyplesin is an antimicrobial peptide isolated from the horseshoe crab with a molecular weight of 2.36 kDa and the amino acid sequence KWCFRVCYRGICYRRCR.
