= Dermaseptin =

Identifiers
- Symbol: DD_K
- Pfam: PF12121
- TCDB: 1.C.52
- OPM superfamily: 211
- OPM protein: 2dd6
Available protein structures:
- Pfam: structures / ECOD
- PDB: RCSB PDB; PDBe; PDBj
- PDBsum: structure summary

Dermaseptins are a family of peptides isolated from skin of the frog genus Phyllomedusa. The sequence of the dermaseptins varies greatly but due to the presence of lysine residues all are cationic and most have the potential to form amphipathic helices in water or when integrated with the lipid bilayer of the bacterial membrane. Clear separation of two lobes of positive and negative intramolecular electrostatic potential is thought to be important in cytotoxic activity. Dermaseptins are typically 27-34 amino acid residues in length and were the first vertebrate peptides demonstrated as having a lethal effect on the filamentous fungi implicated in severe opportunistic infections accompanying immunodeficiency syndrome and immunosuppressive drug therapy.

Dermaseptin use in a novel drug delivery system has been proposed. The system is based on the affinity of dermaseptins for the plasma membrane of human erythrocytes. After transient loading of the cells with the non-toxic dermaseptin S4 analogue K4–S4(1–13)a, the peptide is transported in the systemic circulation to distant microbial targets. Upon reaching a microorganism for which it has greater affinity the dermaseptin derivative is spontaneously transferred to the microbial membrane where it exerts its membrane-lytic activity.

== See also ==
- Antimicrobial resistance
