= Aurein =

Antimicrobial20

Identifiers
- Symbol: Antimicrobial20
- Pfam: PF08256
- InterPro: IPR013157
- TCDB: 1.C.76
- OPM superfamily: 211
- OPM protein: 1vm5
Available protein structures:
- PDB: IPR013157 PF08256 (ECOD; PDBsum)
- AlphaFold: IPR013157; PF08256

This family of antibacterial peptides are secreted from the granular dorsal glands of Litoria aurea (Green and golden bell frog), Litoria raniformis (Southern bell frog), Litoria citropa (Australian blue mountains tree frog) and frogs from genus Uperoleia. Amongst the more active of these are aurein 1.2, aurein 2.2 and aurein 3.1; caerin 1.1, maculatin 1.1, uperin 3.6; citropin 1.1, citropin 1.2, citropin 1.3 and a minor peptide are wide-spectrum antibacterial peptides.
