= Drosocin =

Antimicrobial peptide

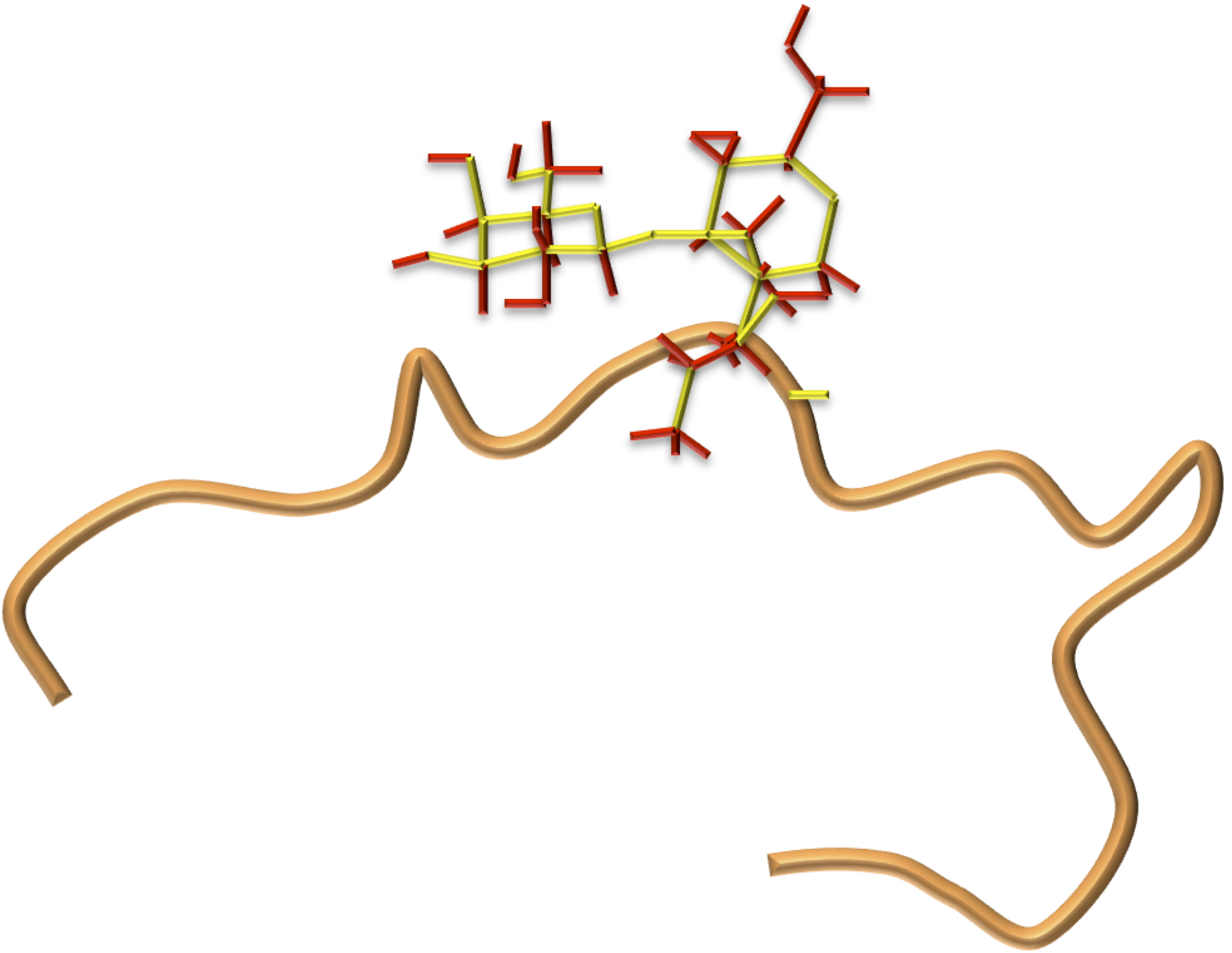
- Drosocin of Drosophila melanogaster

Identifiers
- Symbol: Drosocin, Dro or Drc
- Pfam: DIM
Available protein structures:
- PDB: DIM (ECOD; PDBsum)
- AlphaFold: DIM

Drosocin is a 19-residue long antimicrobial peptide (AMP) of flies first isolated in the fruit fly Drosophila melanogaster, and later shown to be conserved throughout the genus Drosophila. Drosocin is regulated by the NF-κB Imd signalling pathway in the fly.

The Drosocin gene encodes two peptides: its namesake Drosocin peptide and a second peptide called Buletin.

== Structure and function ==
Drosocin is primarily active against Gram-negative bacteria. The peptide is proline-rich with proline-arginine repeats, as well a critical threonine residue. This threonine is O-glycosylated, which is required for antimicrobial activity. This O-glycosylation can be performed either by mono- or disaccharides, which have different activity spectra. Like the antimicrobial peptides pyrrhocoricin and abaecin, drosocin early studies showed it can bind to bacterial DnaK, inhibiting cell machinery and replication. However the action of these drosocin-like peptides may instead be to bind to microbe ribosomes, preventing protein translation. Proline-rich peptides such as drosocin are potentiated by the presence of pore-forming peptides, which facilitates the entry of drosocin-like peptides into the bacterial cell. In the absence of pore-forming peptides, the related AMP pyrrhocoricin is taken into the bacteria by the action of uptake permeases. In Drosophila melanogaster the Drosocin gene is specifically important for the fly defense against infection by Enterobacter cloacae bacteria, supporting previous in vitro work showing Drosocin is active against E. cloacae.

The Drosocin gene of Drosophila neotestacea uniquely encodes tandem repeats of Drosocin mature peptides between cleavage sites. As a result, a single protein gets chopped up into multiple Drosocin peptides. This tandem repeat structure is also found in the honeybee AMP apidaecin or fruit fly Baramicin, and is hypothesized as an evolutionary mechanism to increase the speed of the immune response and AMP production.

== Molecular structure ==
The bolded threonine residue acts as a site for O-glycosylation, also found in the AMPs abaecin and pyrrhocoricin. The underlined PRP motifs are key to the binding of such peptides to the DnaK proteins of bacteria.

D. melanogaster drosocin: GKPRPYSPRPTSHPRPIRV
