= Cecropin =

Cecropin family
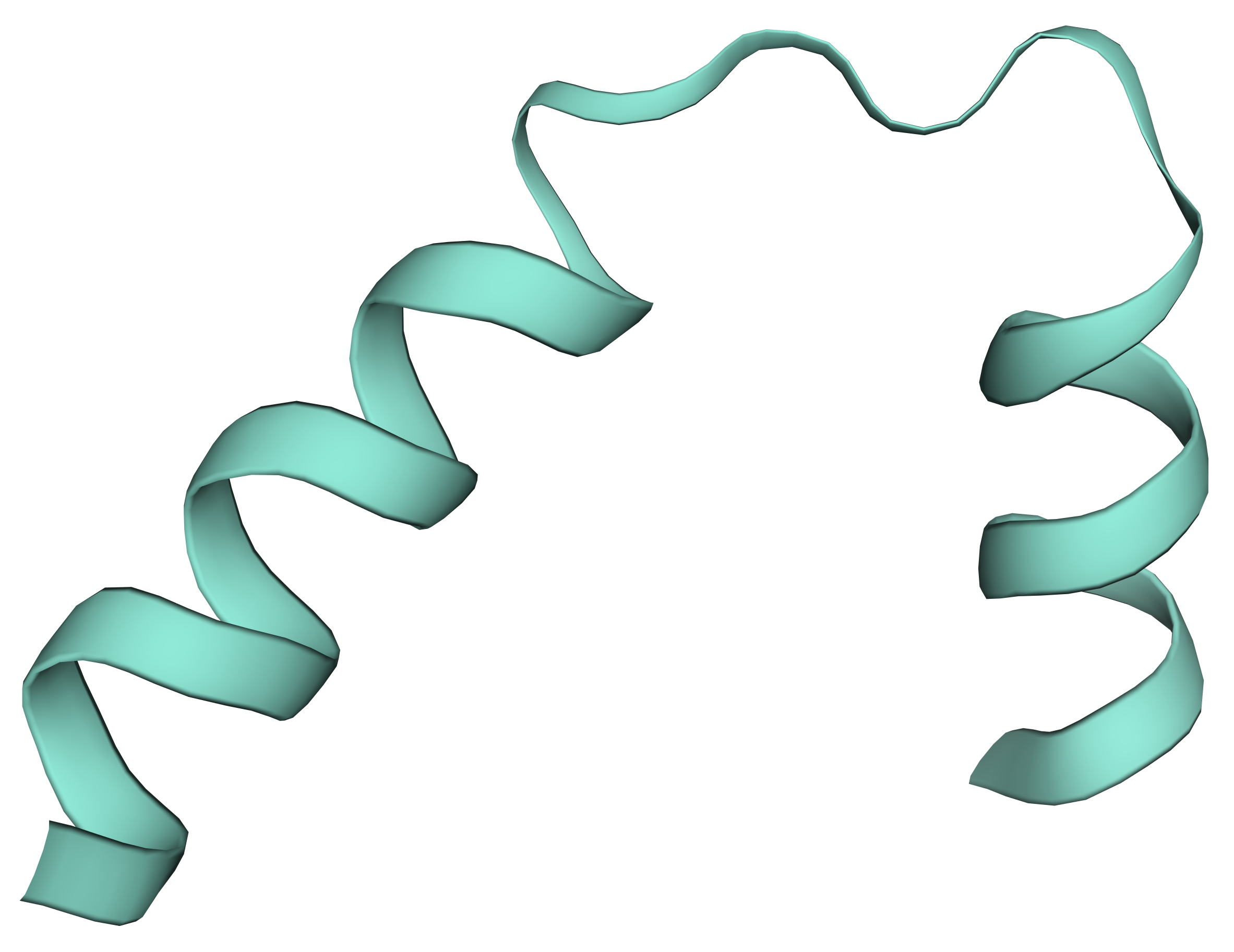
- Model of Drosophila melanogaster Cecropin A

Identifiers
- Symbol: Cecropin
- Pfam: PF00272
- InterPro: IPR000875
- PROSITE: PDOC00241
- SCOP2: 1f0d / SCOPe / SUPFAM
- TCDB: 1.C.17
- OPM superfamily: 151
- OPM protein: 1d9j
Available protein structures:
- PDB: IPR000875 PF00272 (ECOD; PDBsum)
- AlphaFold: IPR000875; PF00272

Cecropins are antimicrobial peptides. They were first isolated from the hemolymph of Hyalophora cecropia, whence the term cecropin was derived. Cecropins lyse bacterial cell membranes; they also inhibit proline uptake and cause leaky membranes.

Cecropins constitute a main part of the innate immune system of insects. Cecropins are small proteins anywhere from 31 to 37 amino acids long and are active against both gram-positive and gram-negative bacteria. Cecropins isolated from insects other than Hyalophora cecropia (Cecropia moth) have been given various names, such as bactericidin, lepidopterin, and sarcotoxin. All of these peptides are structurally related.

== Members ==
Members include:

Cecropin A
Peptide Sequence (KWKLFKKIEKVGQNIRDGIIKAGPAVAVVGQATQIAK). Secondary structure includes two α helices. At low peptide to lipid ratios ion channels are formed, at high peptide to lipid ratios pores are formed.

Cecropin B
Peptide Sequence (KWKVFKKIEKMGRNIRNGIVKAGPAIAVLGEAKAL). Secondary structure includes two α helices.

CECD
from Aedes aegypti (Yellow fever mosquito).

Papiliocin
from Papilio xuthus (a butterfly)

Cecropin P1
Peptide Sequence (SWLSKTAKKLENSAKKRISEGIAIAIQGGPR). An antibacterial peptide from Ascaris suum, a parasitic nematode that resides in the pig intestine, also belongs to this family.

== Derivatives ==
A derivative of Cecropin B is an anticancer polypeptide(L). Structure consists of mainly alpha helixes, determined by solution NMR. Protein molecular weight = 4203.4g/mol.

Some of the cecropins (e.g. cecropin A, and cecropin B) have anticancer properties and are called anticancer peptides (ACPs). Hybrid ACPs based on Cecropin A have been studied for anticancer properties.

== Anticancer properties ==
Anticancer activities of cecropin B, cecropin P1, and Shiva-1 were first demonstrated with in vitro studies of mammalian leukemia and lymphoma cell lines, where cells were sensitive to peptide concentrations on the order of 10^{−6} M. Two multidrug-resistant breast and ovarian cancer cell lines also showed sensitivity to the peptides. Further, peptide anticancer activity is reported as being complete within one hour of treatment. In vivo studies of murine ascitic colon adenocarcinoma cells showed a similar trend, where mice treated with cecropin B exhibited increased survival time compared to untreated mice. Structural studies of cecropin B and its derivative cecropin B3 showed that anticancer activity arises from the ability of the antimicrobial peptides to form pores in stomach carcinoma cell membranes. Measuring electrical currents on cell surfaces showed that cecropin B, but not cecropin B3, induces outward currents indicative of pore formation. Further, cecropin B3 lacks an amphipathic group present in cecropin B, suggesting that this amphipathic group is necessary for cecropin B to insert into cell membranes and form pores. Cecropin B has strong activity on bacteria as well as cancer cells, while B3 has little effect on either. Notably, another derivative, cecropin B1, has two amphipathic regions and exhibits potent activity against human leukemia cell lines at concentrations that do not affect normal fibroblasts or red blood cells.

Different cecropins act on different types of human cancer cells and show activity at concentrations that are not harmful to normal cells. For example, a recent study of Cecropins A and B demonstrated strongly cytotoxic activity against four bladder cancer cell lines, while benign murine and human fibroblasts were not susceptible to Cecropin A or B. Cecropins from many insect species have been shown to be active against a diverse range of human cancer cell lines. For example, Mdcec, a cecropin originating from the common housefly, has been shown to have an antiproliferative effect on human hepatocellular carcinoma cell line BEL-7402 without affecting normal liver cells. Flow cytometry and RT-PCR experiments revealed that treatment with Mdcec increased expression of pro-apoptotic genes such as caspase-3, leading to cancer cell death. These same genes did not show significant expression changes in healthy cells upon treatment with Mdcec. This suggests a degree of specificity which has promise for development of novel cancer therapies.

Further supporting therapeutic efficacy, a study of cecropin A affirmed that cecropin A selectively lyses leukemia cells while exerting little effect on normal lymphocytes. In the same study, chemotherapy drugs cytarabine and 5-fluorouracil synergize with cecropin A in vitro to enhance cytotoxic effects on leukemia cells. This indicates potential for therapeutic application of antimicrobial peptides in cancer, where treatment with cecropins could lower the required dosage of chemotherapy drugs, reducing undesirable side effects. Major challenges to the use of cecropins as cancer therapeutics are delivery of the peptides to tumor cells. Repeated administration of peptides is necessary to maintain systemic levels of cecropins at sufficient concentrations for anti-cancer activity. This need for repeated administration complicates potential treatment plans. One proposed alternative suggests use of gene therapy to introduce cecropin genes into cancer cells. A study in which cecropin genes were expressed in a human bladder carcinoma cell line showed that tumor cells bearing cecropin genes have reduced tumorigenicity, up to complete loss of tumorigenicity in some cell clones.

More recent studies have identified new cecropins, which may be prove useful in development of cancer therapeutics. For example, genome and transcriptome analyses of the spruce budworm Choristoneura fumiferana resulted in identification of novel cecropins which differ from previously characterized cecropins in that they are negatively charged, rather than positively charged. A BH3-like motif (amino acid sequence G-[KQR]-[HKQNR]-[IV]-[KQR]) is present in both anionic and cationic cecropins, and analysis suggests that this motif may interact with Bcl-2, a protein implicated in apoptosis. Further study of cecropin structure and anticancer properties may inform design of novel cancer therapeutics.

== Antibiofilm properties ==
Cecropin A can destroy planktonic and sessile biofilm-forming uropathogenic E. coli (UPEC) cells, either alone or when combined with the antibiotic nalidixic acid, synergistically clearing infection in vivo (in the insect host Galleria mellonella) without off-target cytotoxicity. The multi-target mechanism of action involves outer membrane permeabilization followed by biofilm disruption triggered by the inhibition of efflux pump activity and interactions with extracellular and intracellular nucleic acids.
