= Attacin =

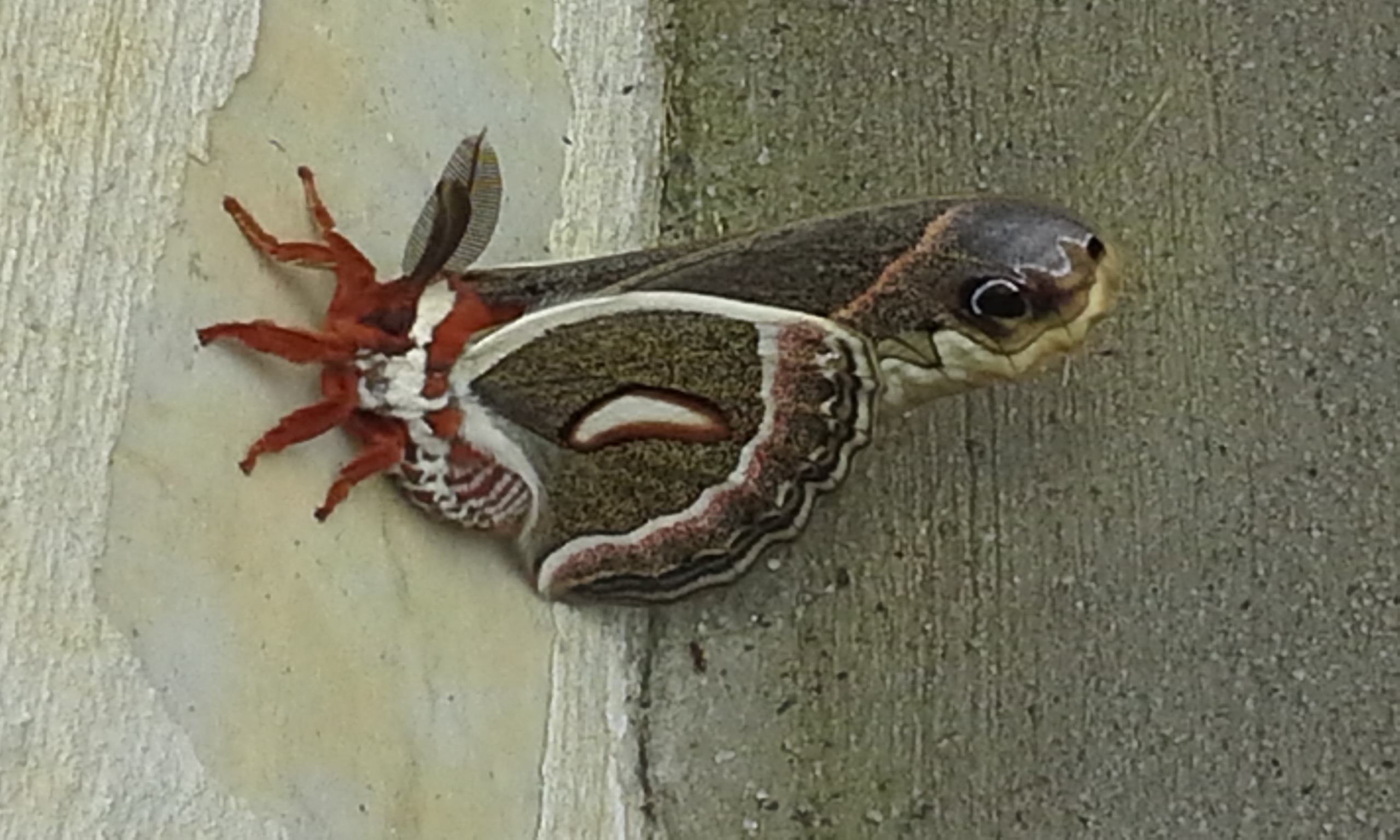
- The silk moth, Hyalophora cecropia

Identifiers
- Symbol: Attacin, Att
- InterPro: IPR040428

Attacin is a glycine-rich protein of about 20 kDa belonging to the group of antimicrobial peptides (AMP). It is active against Gram-negative bacteria.

Attacin was first discovered in Hyalophora cecropia, but is widely conserved in different insects from butterflies to fruit flies.

== See also ==
- Diptericin, a structurally related antimicrobial peptide
