= SPAG =

SPAG or Spag may refer to:

- Submarine Parachute Assistance Group of Britain's Royal Navy, assists in submarine rescues
- Anthony "Spag" Borgatti (1916–1996), founder of Spag's discount store in Massachusetts
- St. Petersburg Immobilien und Beteiligungs AG (SPAG), a company suspected of links with the Cali Cartel organised crime group
- Spelling, punctuation and grammar
- Sperm-associated antigen, human proteins, including:
  - SPAG1: Sperm-associated antigen 1
  - SPAG5: Sperm-associated antigen 5
  - SPAG6: Sperm-associated antigen 6
  - SPAG7: Sperm-associated antigen 7
  - SPAG8: Sperm-associated antigen 8
  - SPAG9: Sperm-associated antigen 9
  - SPAG11B: Sperm-associated antigen 11B
- Sri Petaling Line and Ampang Line, two light rail transit lines in Kuala Lumpur where the individual lines' code SPL and AGL are often combined and written as SPAG because they run on single system

== See also ==
- Spag bol, slang for spaghetti bolognese, a pasta dish
