= PRR23A =

Human gene and protein

Identifiers
- Aliases: PRR23A, proline rich 23A
- External IDs: MGI: 3645937; GeneCards: PRR23A

Gene location (Human)
Chr.	Chromosome 3 (human)
Band	3q23	Start	139,003,962 bp
Band	3q23	End	139,006,268 bp

Gene location (Mouse)
Chr.	Chromosome 9 (mouse)
Band	9|9 E3.3	Start	98,738,547 bp
Band	9|9 E3.3	End	98,739,427 bp
RNA expression pattern
Bgee	Human / Mouse (ortholog); Top expressed in: gonad; testicle; right testis; bone marrow cell; left testis / Top expressed in: embryo; zygote; secondary oocyte; primary oocyte; More reference expression data
BioGPS	n/a
Orthologs
Databases	NCBI: entry; OMA: entry
Species	Human	Mouse
Entrez	729627	623186
Ensembl	ENSG00000206260	ENSMUSG00000063058
UniProt	A6NEV1	D3YWX5
RefSeq (mRNA)	NM_001134659	NM_001134661
RefSeq (protein)	NP_001128131	NP_001128133
Location (UCSC)	Chr 3: 139 – 139.01 Mb	Chr 9: 98.74 – 98.74 Mb
PubMed search
- Wikidata
View/Edit Human	View/Edit Mouse

Proline-Rich Protein 23A is a protein that is encoded by the Proline-Rich 23A (PRR23A) gene.

== Gene ==
=== Locus ===
The human PRR23A gene is on chromosome 3 at position 3q23 and is located on the antisense strand. The gene is encoded from position 139,003,962 to 139,006,268. It consists on 1 exon and spans 2,307 base pairs. Other genes in the neighborhood include: FOXL2NB, FOXL2, PRR23B, and PRR23C. The FOXL2NB gene has tissue enriched expression in ovaries, and PRR23A has demonstrated expression in the ovary as well. Aliases for PRR23A include: Proline-Rich 23A, Proline-Rich Protein 23A, and UPF0572 Protein ENSP00000372650. Two of those genes, PRR23B and PRR23C, are paralogs to PRR23A.

=== Gene expression ===
PRR23A is primarily expressed at low levels in the brain and testis. There were also very low levels of PRR23A expression detected in ovary and bone marrow tissue. Genes typically show high expression in the testis during RNA sequencing since it is a highly transcriptionally active tissue due to its function of sperm production. However, some researchers have noted that this testis tissue expression of PRR23A may be legitimate since PRR23 family genes are thought to play a role in male reproduction. Furthermore, brain and testis tissue share biochemical characteristics and express a large number of common genes. This may also explain why PRR23A expression has been found at similar levels within the brain and testis.

PRR23A Gene Expression Includes the Tissues that PRR23A RNA Transcript has Been Identified in Through RNA Sequencing Data
Tissue	Cerebellum	Choroid Plexus	White Matter	Cerebral Cortex	Medulla Oblongata	Pons	Thalamus	Amygdala	Hippocampal Formation	Midbrain	Basal Ganglia	Hypothalamus	Spinal Cord	Testis	Ovary	Bone Marrow
RNA Abundance (nTPM)	2.4	1.7	1.7	1.6	1.6	1.6	1.5	1.4	1.3	1.3	1.2	1.2	1.2	1.5	0.1	0.1

== mRNA transcript ==
Since PRR23A consists of 1 exon, there are no alternative splicing products. This also means that the 1 known isoform in humans has an mRNA sequence of 2,307 nucleotides which matches the length of the PRR23A gene. mRNA typically contain a 5' UTR with a median length of 170 nucleotides in humans, but the human PRR23A mRNA sequence does not contain a 5' UTR. Instead, the FASTA sequence for human PRR23A begins with the start codon ATG. Although, the 5' UTR is not translated, it plays a major regulatory role for the translation of coding sequence nucleotides to their amino acids that go on to form a protein structure. Therefore, it is unlikely that human PRR23A does not have this region, and that its upstream 5' UTR sequence could be obtained through further sequencing research.

== Protein ==
Human PRR23A consists of 266 amino acids, has a predicted molecular weight of 28.2 kDal, and a predicted basal isoelectric point of 4.57. PRR23A, as its name implies, is enriched with the amino acid proline. Therefore, PRR23A belongs to the category of proteins called proline-rich proteins. PRR23A contains less asparagine, threonine, and lysine compared to other human proteins. This protein composition for PRR23A is generally conserved across species.

Human PRR23A Protein CompositionIncludes Percent Composition of Each Amino Acid for Human PRR23A and How that Percent Composition Compares to Other Human Proteins
Amino Acid	Pro (P)	Ala (A)	Leu (L)	Ser (S)	Glu (E)	Gly (G)	Val (V)	Arg (R)	Asp (D)	Phe (F)	Gln (Q)	Ile (I)	Cys (C)	His (H)	Thr (T)	Lys (K)	Met (M)	Try (Y)	Trp (W)	Asn (N)
Composition of Human PRR23A	16.2%	10.5%	10.5%	9.8%	9.0%	7.5%	7.1%	6.4%	5.3%	3.4%	3.0%	2.3%	1.5	1.5	1.5	1.1	1.1%	1.1	0.80%	0.4
Composition of PRR23A Compared to Other Human Proteins	very rich	average	average	average	average	average	average	average	average	average	average	average	average	average	very poor	poor	average	average	average	very poor

=== Secondary and tertiary structure ===
Human PRR23A is mainly a disordered protein with small stretches of beta strands and alpha helices forming. There are 2 known disordered regions at the beginning and the end of the protein. There are 6 regions from the beginning-middle of the protein sequence that are predicted to form beta strands, and when folded into the tertiary structure are in the middle of the predicted protein structure. There is 1 possible transmembrane domain that is located in 1 of these beta strands. Some proteins can create transmembrane beta barrels when a beta sheet curls on itself to make a tube that goes through a membrane, so the PRR23A could exhibit this phenomenon. There are 2 regions towards the end of the protein sequence that are predicted to form alpha helices, and when folded into a tertiary structure are in the middle of the predicted protein structure.

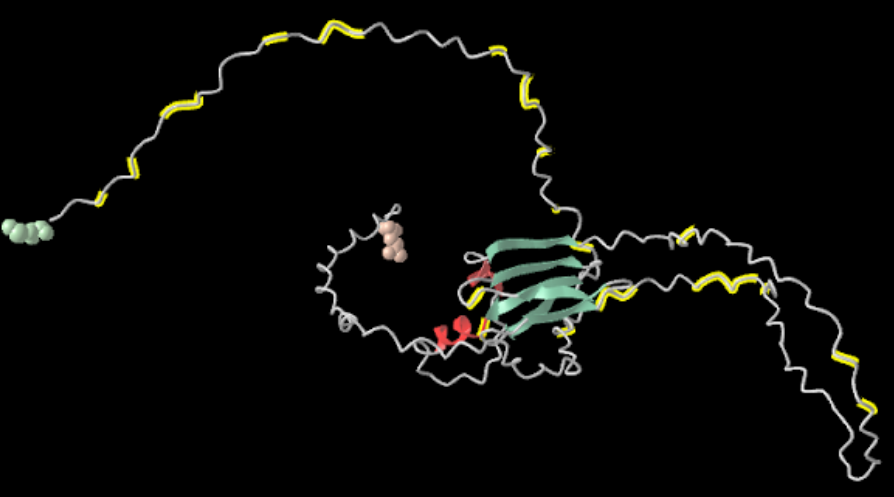
iCN3D Human PRR23A Protein Structure With Proline DistributionThe proline amino acids are highlighted in yellow. Predicted beta strands are shown in a green ribbon structure, and predicted alpha helices are shown in a red ribbon structure. The start of the protein is represented by pale green spheres, and the end of the protein is represented by pale red spheres

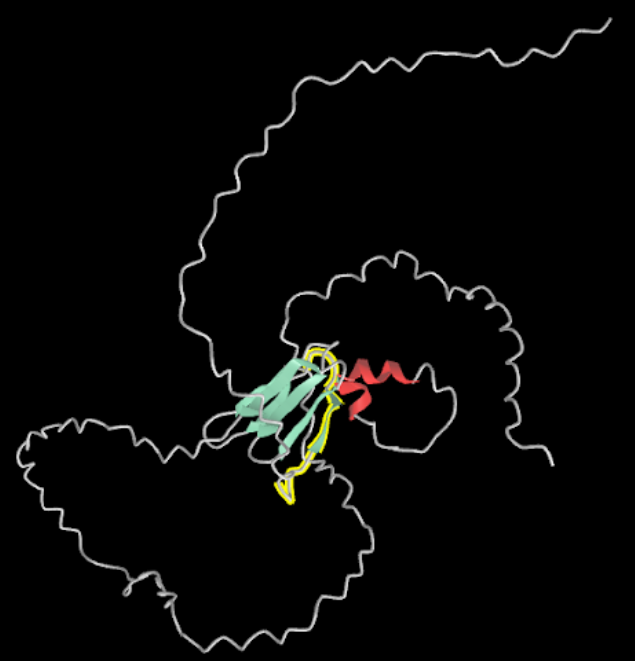
iCN3D Human PRR23A Protein StructureThe 6 predicted beta strands are shown in a green ribbon structure, and the 2 predicted alpha helices are shown in a red ribbon structure. The region of PRR23A that is predicted to be a transmembrane domain is highlighted in yellow

=== Subcellular localization ===
Antibody detection in human stomach cells has shown that PRR23A localizes in the membrane and cytoplasm. Further investigation of the PRR23A protein sequence has also identified a small transmembrane region towards the beginning of the protein, and signal sequences for the ER membrane, nucleus, and mitochondria.

=== Interacting proteins ===
PRR23A does not have very many known interactions. The most significant protein interactions for human PRR23A are DEFB106A and DEFB107A which have been determined though co-expression data and textmining. Co-expression data has also shown that DEFB106A and DEFB107A interact with one another. This means that PRR23A, DEFB106A, and DEFB107A have been observed to be correlated in expression across a large number of experiments. DEFB105A, DEFB106B, IQCJ, FAM90A10P, SPAG11B, PRSS22, USP17L4, and USP17L7 are also thought to interact with PRR23A. The basis of these interactions were determined through textmining, so further experiments such as the yeast two-hybrid assay should be conducted to increase the confidence of these protein interactions.

Summary of PRR23A Protein InteractionsIncludes Info About DEFB106A, DEFB107A, DEFB105A, DEFB106B, IQCJ, FAM90A10P, SPAG11B, PRSS22, USP17L4, and USP17L7
Name	Basis	Function
DEFB106A Beta-defensin 106A	Textmining and Co-expression	Belongs to the defensin family which are antimicrobial and cytotoxic peptides made by neutrophils. Associated with Diamond-Blackfan Anemia15, Mandibulofacial with Dysostosis, and Keratomalacia. Enables lipopolysaccharide binding, protein binding, heparin binding and CCR2 chemokine receptor binding
DEFB107A Beta-defensin 107A	Textmining and Co-expression	Belongs to the defensin family which are antimicrobial and cytotoxic peptides made by neutrophils. Enables lipid binding
DEFB105A Beta-defensin 105A	Textmining	Belongs to the defensin family which are antimicrobial and cytotoxic peptides made by neutrophils. Associated with Familial Hypertrophic Cardiomyopathy 12, and Familial Hypertrophic Cardiomyopathy 6
DEFB106B Beta-defensin 106B	Textmining	Belongs to the defensin family which are antimicrobial and cytotoxic peptides made by neutrophils. Associated with Diamond-Blackfan Anemia15, Mandibulofacial with Dysostosis. Enables lipopolysaccharide binding, protein binding, heparin binding and CCR2 chemokine receptor binding
IQCJ IQ motif containing J	Textmining	NA
FAM90A10P Putative protein FAM90A10P	Textmining	Belongs to the FAM90 family
SPAG11B Sperm associated antigen 11B	Textmining	Encodes several androgen-dependent, epididymis-specific secretory proteins. Thought to be involved in sperm maturation. Associated with Small Intestine Lymphoma and Herpes Zoster Oticus
PRSS22 Serine protease 22	Textmining	Gene encodes a member of the trypsin family of serine-proteases. Preferentially cleaves the synthetic substrate H-D-Leu-Thr-Arg-pNA compared to tosyl-Gly-Pro-Arg-pNA. Enables serine-type endopeptidase activity and peptidase activator activity
USP17L4 Ubiquitin specific peptidase 17 like family member 4	Textmining	Predicted to enable cysteine-type endopeptidase activity and thiol-dependent deubiquitinase
USP17L7 Ubiquitin specific peptidase 17 like family member 7	Textmining	Predicted to enable cysteine-type endopeptidase activity and thiol-dependent deubiquitinase

== Post-translational modifications ==
Post-translational modifications for human PRR23A include: phosphorylation, acetylation, myristoylation, sulfonation, SUMOylation, and glycosylation. The glycosylation site supports the identified transmembrane region and ER membrane subcellular localization of PRR23A since proteins that are glycosylated are typically membrane bound and expressed in the ER.

== Homology ==
=== Paralogs ===
There are 2 known paralogs of PRR23A: PRR23B and PRR23C.

Summary of PRR23 Family Proteins Found in HumansSimilarity of Human PRR23B and PRR23C to PRR23A
Protein	Accession number	Sequence length (Amino Acids)	E-value	Sequence identity to Human PRR23A Protein (%)	Sequence similarity to Human PRR23A Protein (%)
PRR23A	NP_001128131	266	0	100	100
PRR23B	NP_001013672	265	5e-146	89.8	91.4
PRR23C	NP_001128129	262	1e-116	84.6	86.8

=== Orthologs ===
PRR23A orthologs are only found in placental mammals. No PRR23A orthologs have been identified in marsupials, monotremes, birds, reptiles, amphibians, fish, or invertebrates.

PRR23A OrthologsContains Some Select PRR23A Orthologs from Each Major Mammalian Group Where PRR23A is Present
Genus and species	Common name	Taxonomic group	Median Date of Divergence (Millions of Years Ago)	Accession number	Sequence length (Amino Acids)	Sequence identity to human protein (%)	Sequence similarity to human protein (%)
Homo sapiens	Human	Primates	0	NP_001128131	266	100	100
Macaca mulatta	Rhesus Monkey	Primates	28.8	XP_001113833	282	83.3	85.5
Mus musculus	Mouse	Rodentia	87	NP_001128132	258	41.3	53.1
Ochotona princeps	American Pika	Lagomorpha	87	XP_058513009	276	39.7	50.8
Pteropus alecto	Black Flying Fox	Chiroptera	94	XP_006907257	273	63	69.2
Sturnira hondurensis	Honduran Yellow-Shouldered Bat	Chiroptera	94	XP_036917059	270	56.9	64.1
Leptonychotes weddellii	Weddell Seal	Carnivora	94	XP_006734260	260	53.1	61.7
Canis lupus familiaris	Dog	Carnivora	94	XP_038288414	243	53	59.8
Neophocaena asiaeorientalis asiaeorientalis	Yangtze Finless Porpoise	Cetacea	94	XP_024606498	261	53	61.9
Hippopotamus amphibius kiboko	East African Hippopotamus	Hippopotamidae	94	XP_057593770	263	51.9	60.5
Equus caballus	Horse	Perissodactyla	94	XP_023477063	279	59.6	68.1
Camelus ferus	Wild Bactrian Camel	Tylopoda	94	XP_032343448	258	56.4	63.5
Phacochoerus africanus	Common Warthog	Suiformes	94	XP_047608137	262	47.3	57.4
Moschus berezovskii	Dwarf Musk Deer	Ruminantia	94	XP_055276284	291	45.2	54.2
Talpa occidentalis	Spanish Mole	Talpidae	94	XP_037382562	264	54.1	64.4
Sorex araneus	Common Shrew	Soricidae	94	XP_054980762	217	41.6	46.8
Erinaceus europaeus	European Hedgehog	Erinaceidae	94	XP_060039908	274	27.8	40.6
Elephas maximus indicus	Indian Elephant	Proboscidea	99	XP_049726169	235	53.4	58.6
Loxodonta africana	African Savanna Elephant	Proboscidea	99	XP_003420004	235	53.4	58.6
Orycteropus afer afer	Aardvark	Tubulidentata	99	XP_007945733	243	52.9	58

=== Evolution ===
PRR23A first appeared within placental mammals which evolved 78-129 million years ago. Then, placental mammals began to diversify into two the major lineages of Atlantogenata and Boreoeutheria which emerged 90-100 million years ago. PRR23A orthologs can be found within both of these major lineages, and several subgroups that evolved as well. Despite PRR23A's recent emergence in the long run of evolutionary history, it is evolving at a very rapid rate.

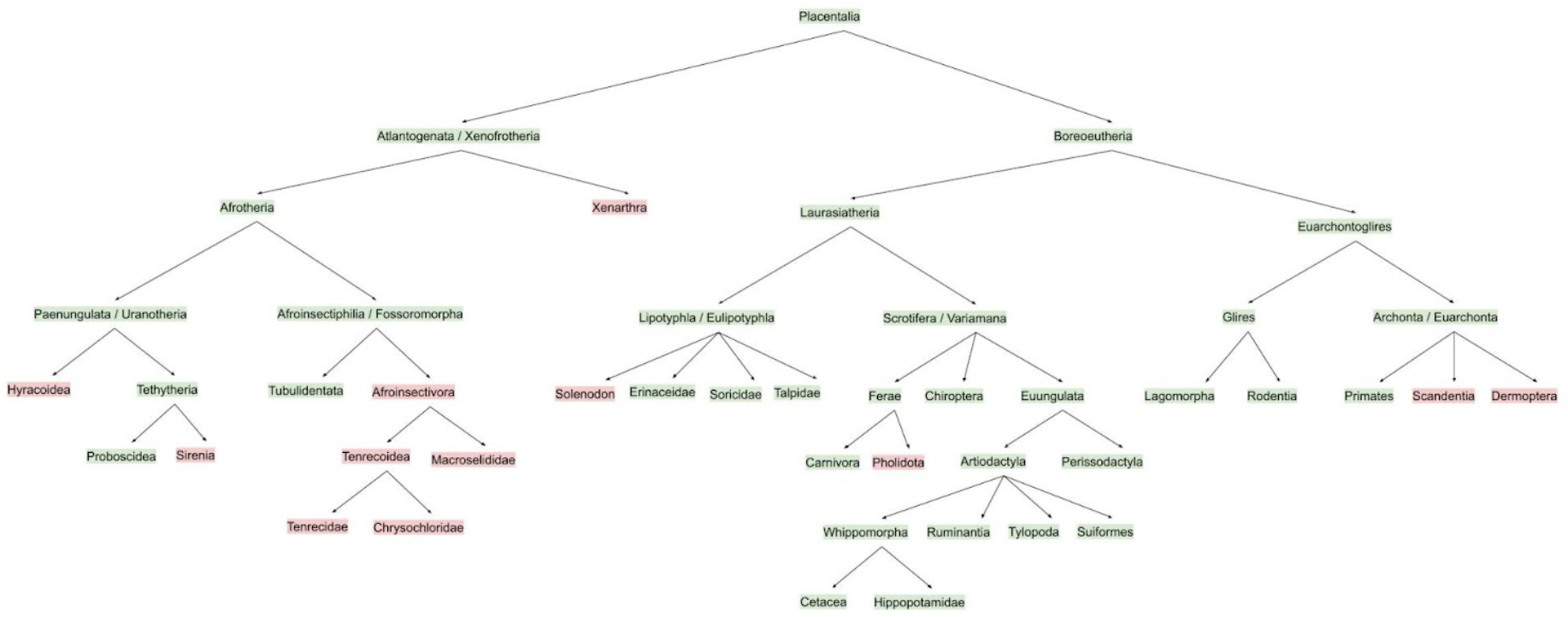
PRR23A Evolution from Placental MammalsGreen indicates presence and red indicates absence of PRR23A proteins within a group

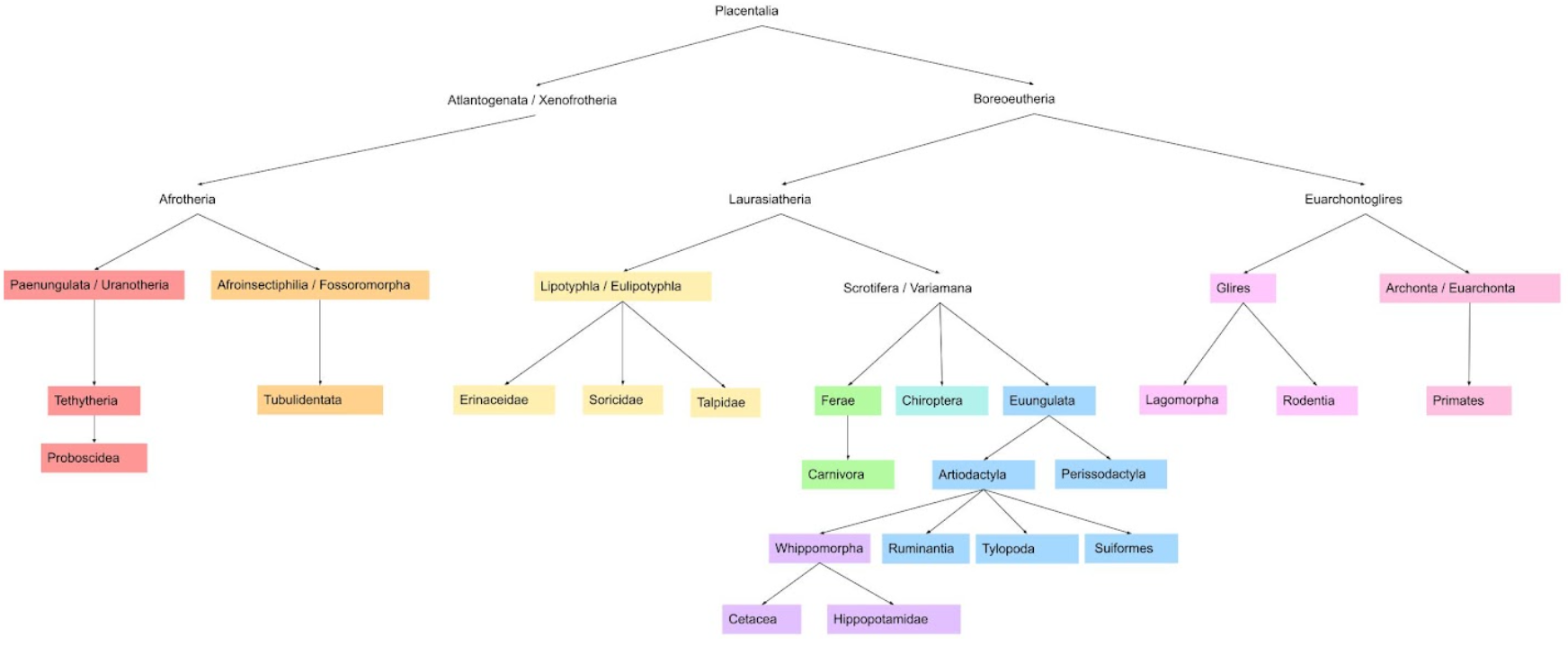
PRR23A Presence in Organisms Evolved from Placental MammalsThe different colors indicate significant differences between the groups

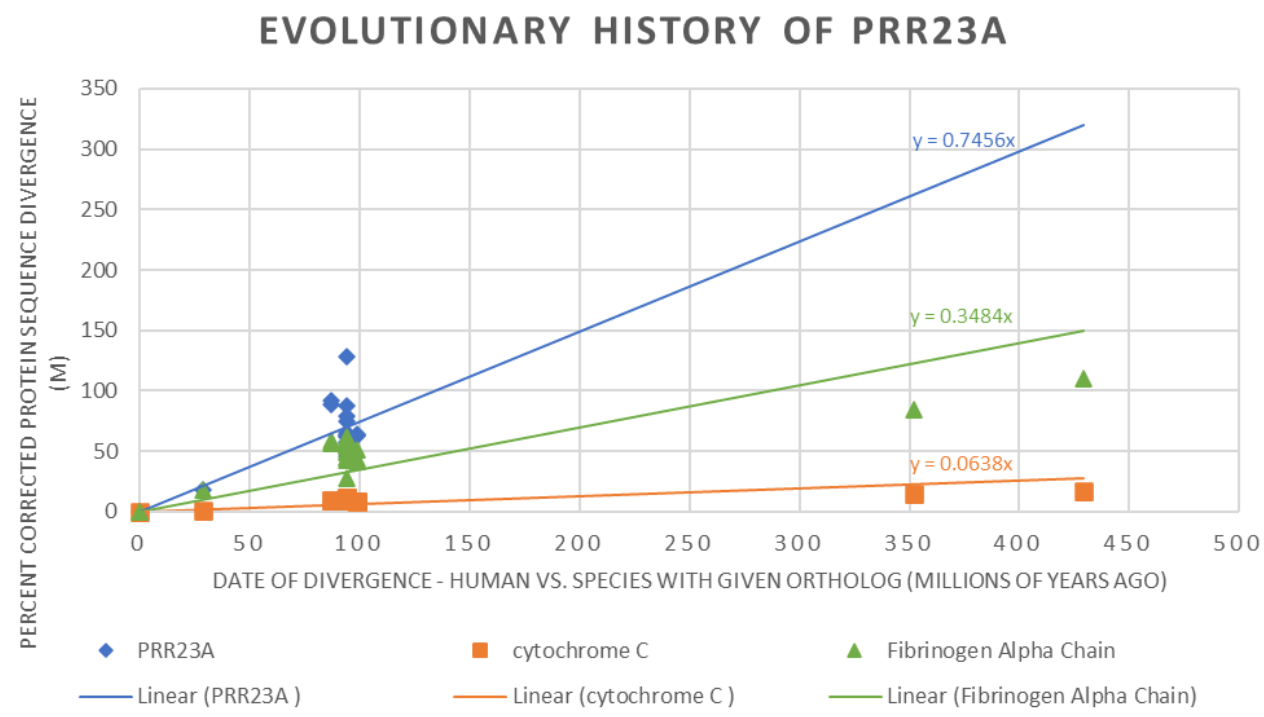
Rate of Evolution for PRR23A GeneShows the approximate date of divergence from humans for the species listed in the ortholog table above versus the corrected percent divergence (m) of the orthologous protein and the human protein for PRR23A, Cytochrome C, and Fibrinogen Alpha Chain. The slope of the lines corresponds to how fast the genes for the proteins included are evolving. Since PRR23A has a stepper slope (y=0.7456x) than Cytochrome C (y=0.3484x) and Fibrinogen Alpha (y=0.0638x), PRR23A is evolving rapidly

== Function ==
PRR23A has demonstrated gene expression within the testis through increased mRNA levels, and so have the other PRR23 family genes. This expression indicates that PRR23A may have a role within the male reproductive system. The larger family of proline-rich proteins have a large range of functions including: energy provisions, antistress responses, calcium binding in saliva, structure support, and many others. One subgroup called small proline-rich proteins (SPRRs) are antimicrobial proteins that direct bacterial membrane disruption.

== Clinical significance and pathology ==
Epigenetic modifications of PRR23A have been shown to impact maternal early-pregnancy serum ferritin concentrations. 2 CpG sites within human PRR23A have been identified: cg02806645 and cg06322988. When these locations are methylated, a decrease in serum ferritin concentrations during early-pregnancy was observed. Low levels of ferritin are a sign of iron deficiency which is especially important to monitor during pregnancy. Therefore, the decreased expression of PRR23A though methylation silencing is associated with iron deficiency.
