= Reproductive immunology =

Reproductive immunology refers to a field of medicine that studies interactions (or the absence of them) between the immune system and components related to the reproductive system, such as maternal immune tolerance towards the fetus, or immunological interactions across the blood-testis barrier. The concept has been used by fertility clinics to explain fertility problems, recurrent miscarriages and pregnancy complications observed when this state of immunological tolerance is not successfully achieved. Immunological therapy is a method for treating many cases of previously unexplained infertility or recurrent miscarriage.

== Immune system in pregnancy ==
The immunological system of the mother plays an important role in pregnancy considering the embryo's tissue is half foreign and unlike mismatched organ transplant, is not normally rejected. During pregnancy, immunological events that take place within the body of the mother are crucial in determining the health of both mother and fetus. The mother must develop immunotolerance to her fetus since both organisms live in an intimate symbiotic situation. Progesterone-induced-blocking factor 1 (PIBF1) is one of several known contributing immunomodulatory factors to play a role in immunotolerance during pregnancy.

The placenta also plays an important part in protecting the embryo for the immune attack from the mother's system. Secretory molecules produced by placental trophoblast cells and maternal uterine immune cells, within the decidua, work together to develop a functioning placenta. Studies have proposed that proteins in semen may help a person's immune system prepare for conception and pregnancy. For example, there is substantial evidence for exposure to partner's semen as prevention for pre-eclampsia, a pregnancy disorder, largely due to the absorption of several immune modulating factors present in seminal fluid, such as transforming growth factor beta (TGFβ).

=== Insufficient immune tolerance ===
An insufficiency in the maternal immune system where the fetus is treated as a foreign substance in the body can lead to many pregnancy-related complications.

- Rh disease, or Rh isoimmunization, occurs when the maternal immune system develops antibodies that recognizes fetal red blood cells as foreign. This can lead to a number of potentially dangerous consequences to the fetus including hemolytic disease due to the destruction of red blood cells, kernicterus, or even death. Treatment with anti-D immunoglobulin has been studied extensively on the prevention of Rh disease. However, there has been no conclusive evidence that treatment with anti-D immunoglobulin is beneficial to the mother or fetus when it comes to Rh isoimmunization.
- Pre-eclampsia is a disorder prevalent in 5% to 10% of all pregnancies that can lead to vascular health issues such as hypertension which can lead to other complications such as seizures, hemolytic disease, damage to the placenta, and inhibition of the growth and development of the fetus. Risk factors for pre-eclampsia include older maternal age, obesity, and history of vascular disease. Monocyte activation in pregnancy is mediated by pregnancy hormones to prevent monocytes from becoming pro-inflammatory by inducing apoptosis. However, if there is dysfunction in this process, the activation of monocytes can potentially lead to damage and dysfunction in endothelial cells, which is thought to lead to the hallmark inflammation that is seen in pre-eclampsia. Prevention for those at risk for pre-eclampsia may include calcium supplementation, Vitamin C and E supplementation, low-dose aspirin, unfractionated heparin (UFH) and low-molecular-weight heparin (LMWH), and magnesium sulfate. Treatment goals include lowering the mother's blood pressure using antihypertensive medications that are safe to administer in pregnancy.
- Advances in single-cell RNA sequencing have led to the discovery of new insights into how immune system dysfunction could contribute to recurrent pregnancy loss. Due to this technological advancement, individual immune cells in the uterine environment can be identified, allowing researchers to detect and identify specific cell populations. Using these methods, studies have identified that women with recurrent pregnancy loss exhibit altered patterns among their decidual natural killer (dNK) cells. This includes limited supportive dNK cells as well as abnormal development among the cells. Along with that, the T-cell population in recurrent pregnancy loss display more inflammatory and cytotoxic gene expressions compared to a healthy pregnancy. Single-cell analysis has identified miscommunications between natural killer cells, T-cells and macrophages which all contribute to breaking down the maternal-fetal tolerance. These findings suggests that an imbalance between tolerance-promoting immune responses and the pro-inflammatory activity is where the cause of recurring pregnancy loss occurs. Continued advances in single cell analysis hold diagnosing and treating immune-related infertility.
- According to ESHRE guidelines, recurrent miscarriage is defined as 3 or more pregnancy losses before the third trimester (~22 weeks of gestation) and has many etiologies, including many that stem from immune dysfunction, most of which can be treated with immunosuppressive medications
  - An increase in the prevalence of antiphospholipid antibodies (known as antiphospholipid syndrome) can be found in many recurrent miscarriage patients. However, there is no evidence that the increase in antiphospholipid antibodies harms the pregnancy, but it is thought to be indicative of immune dysfunction and proinflammatory responses in regards to the pregnancy.
  - An increase in prevalence of proinflammatory cells and natural killer cells can be found in women experiencing a miscarriage. However, there has been no evidence that the prevalence of these proinflammatory cells can predict pregnancy outcomes, including risk of a miscarriage.
  - Maternal HLA class II allele presence has been found to be potentially linked to predisposed immune attacks against male embryos. Proposed treatments for this immune dysfunction include corticosteroids, allogeneic lymphocyte immunization, intravenous immunoglobulin infusion, and tumor necrosis factor α antagonists.

=== Microbiology ===
==== Uterine natural killer cells ====
The maternal immune system, specifically within the uterus, changes to allow for implantation and protect a pregnancy from immune attack. While natural killer cells (NK cells), part of the innate immune system, are cytotoxic and responsible for attacking pathogens and infected cells, one subtype, uterine natural killer cells (uNK) is modified during pregnancy. Despite the fetus containing foreign paternal antigens, uNK cells do not recognize it as "non-self", so that their cytotoxic effects do not target the developing fetus. The number and type of uNK cells and receptors change during a healthy pregnancy; the uNK profile differs in an abnormal pregnancy. In the first trimester of pregnancy, uNK cells are among the most abundant leukocytes present, but the number slowly declines up until term. It has even been proposed that uNK contributes to the protection of extravillous trophoblast (EVT), important cells that contribute to the growth and development of a fetus. The uNK cells secrete transforming growth factor-β (TGF-β) which is believed to have an immunosuppressive effect through modulation of leukocyte response to trophoblasts.

==== KIRs and human leukocyte antigen ====
Killer-cell immunoglobulin-like receptors (KIRs) are expressed by the uNK cells of the mother. Both polymorphic maternal KIRs and fetal human leukocyte antigen (HLA)-C molecules are variable and specific to a particular pregnancy. In any pregnancy, the maternal KIR genotype could be AA (no activating KIRs), AB, or BB (1–10 activating KIRs) and the HLA-C ligands for KIRs are divided into two groups: HLA-C1 and HLA-C2. Studies have shown that there is poor compatibility between specifically maternal KIR AA and fetal HLA-C2, which leads to recurrent miscarriage, preeclampsia and implantation failures. In assisted reproduction, these new insights could have an impact on the selection of single embryo transfer, oocyte, or sperm donor selection according to KIRs and HLA in patients with recurrent miscarriages.

== Cancer and tumours in pregnancy ==
In both cancer and pregnancy, cells grow and divide at fast rates without being effectively targeted by the human immune system. There is a parallel immunomodulatory mechanism in pregnancy and cancer: T helper cell expression differs based on cytokine levels; in pregnancy, Type 1 (T_{h}1) is up-regulated, whereas in cancer Type 2 (T_{h}2) is up-regulated. In pregnancy, regulatory T cells (T_{reg} cells or Tregs) allow the body to accept the fetus. Tregs perform a similar task with tumors. Cancer treatment aims to lower Treg activity, while treatment for pregnancy complications aims to increase Treg activity. This can cause complications in a person with cancer who is pregnant, since the goal is to decrease Tregs to eliminate the cancer, while that could also harm the fetus. Careful use of Treg-modifying immunotherapy is required to ensure the safety of the pregnant person and the fetus.

Common in women of reproductive age, with an incidence approaching 80% by age 50, uterine fibroids are benign (non-cancerous) smooth muscle tumours. They are generally asymptomatic, although they can cause pain, sometimes severe, especially if large, or subjected to torsion (twisting; may occur when fibroid is pedunculated, with a "stem" or "stalk") or impaction (compression; may be more likely in pregnancy). Between 10 and 30% of women with fibroids develop complications during pregnancy. While their relationship to adverse outcomes is unclear, fibroids are associated with early pregnancy bleeding and loss, premature rupture of membranes and labor, and caesarean sections.

== Medications in pregnancy ==
=== Pharmacokinetics ===
Pregnancy-related anatomical and physiological changes affect pharmacokinetics (absorption, distribution, metabolism, and excretion) of many drugs, which may require drug regimen adjustment. Gastrointestinal motility is affected by delayed gastric emptying and increase gastric pH during pregnancy, which may alter drug absorption. Changes in body composition during pregnancy may change drugs volume of distribution due to increased body weight and fat, increased total plasma volume, and decreased albumin. For drugs susceptible to hepatic elimination are influenced by increased production of estrogen and progesterone. In addition, change in hepatic enzyme activity may increase or decrease drug metabolism based on drug composition, however most hepatic enzymes increase both metabolism and elimination during pregnancy. Also, pregnancy increase glomerular filtration, renal plasma flow, and the activity of transporters, which may require increased drug dosage.

=== FDA regulations ===
FDA established labeling request for drugs and biological products with medication risks, allowing informed decision making for pregnant and breastfeeding women and their health care providers. Pregnancy category was required on the drug label for systemically absorbed medications with the risk of fetal injury, which is now replaced with pregnancy and lactation labeling rule (PLLR). In addition to pregnancy category requirements on information of pregnancy, labor and delivery, and nursing mothers, PLLR also includes information on females animals of reproductive potential. The labeling change were effective starting June 30, 2015. The labeling requirements of over-the-counter (OTC) medicines we not affected.

=== Pharmacologic consideration ===
The change in medication exposure during pregnancy should concern both mother and fetus independently. For example, within antibiotics, penicillin may be used during pregnancy, whereas tetracycline is not recommended due to potential risk of fetus for a wide range of adverse effects.

=== Sulfonamides ===
Some studies have shown that maternal exposure to sulfonamides during pregnancy may be qan increased risk of congenital malformations. There has been no evidence that certain types of sulfonamides or doses administered may increase or decrease the risk. Exposure to sulfonamides has been the only direct connection.

== Drug therapies ==
=== Reducing miscarriage ===
A threatened miscarriage is when signs or symptoms of miscarriage, most often bleeding that occurs in the first 20-weeks of a pregnancy, are present.

As the hormone progesterone is essential for the maintenance of pregnancy – amongst its important effects is maternal immune modulation and suppression of inflammatory responses – it is often used to prevent a threatened miscarriage from completing. Treatment with exogenous progesterone can lower the incidence of miscarriage; overall, though, the research suggests it does not alter the rate of pre-term births or live births. However, one review suggested live birth rates were improved for a subgroup of women treated with micronized vaginal progesterone. The improved outcome was seen in the group at higher risk of miscarriage, this being people who had had three or more miscarriages and were also currently experiencing bleeding.

The use of low dose aspirin may be linked to increased rates of live births and fewer pregnancy losses for people who have had one or two miscarriages. Based on this research, the National Institute of Health (NIH) revised their 2014 advice on using low dose aspirin, stating in 2021 that "low-dose aspirin therapy before conception and during early pregnancy may increase pregnancy chances and live births among women who have experienced one or two prior miscarriages." (Note: This advice diverged from the previous NIH communication in 2014 that only "in a smaller group of women who had experienced a single recent pregnancy loss" would "aspirin increase ... the likelihood of becoming pregnant and having a live birth". Although the two stances were based on the same research, the change was due to a reanalysis of the data, this time looking at differences in treatment adherence between study participants. Accounting for how closely participants were able to follow the dosing regimen revealed that in those able to take the required doses daily, or nearly daily, and not miss days due to side effects such as nausea and vomiting, there was an increased likelihood of pregnancy and live birth. The NIH 's 2021 statement said: "... adhering to the aspirin regimen for five to seven days a week ... culminated in 15 more live births. Women who adhered to the therapy four days per week experienced similar results. The researchers concluded that taking low-dose aspirin at least four days per week could improve the odds for pregnancy and live birth in this group of women.")

=== Antiphospholipid syndrome ===
Some studies have found that using both aspirin and heparin can increase the rate of live birth in a person with antiphospholipid syndrome. It was also found to increase birth weight and gestation age when using heparin and aspirin together. It was also found that people with antiphospholipid syndrome had an increased live birth rate when low-molecular-weight heparin was substituted for heparin and co-administered with aspirin.

== Sperm autoimmunity ==
The presence of anti-sperm antibodies in infertile men was first reported in 1954 by Rumke and Wilson. It has been noticed that the number of cases of sperm autoimmunity is higher in the infertile population leading to the idea that autoimmunity could be a cause of infertility. Anti sperm antigen has been described as three immunoglobulin isotopes (IgG, IgA, IgM) each of which targets different part of the spermatozoa. If more than 10% of the sperm are bound to anti-sperm antibodies (ASA), then infertility is suspected. The blood-testis barrier separates the immune system and the developing spermatozoa. The tight junction between the Sertoli cells form the blood-testis barrier but it is usually breached by physiological leakage. Not all sperms are protected by the barrier because spermatogonia and early spermatocytes are located below the junction. They are protected by other means like immunologic tolerance and immunomodulation.

Infertility after anti-sperm antibody binding can be caused by autoagglutination, sperm cytotoxicity, blockage of sperm-ovum interaction, and inadequate motility. Each presents itself depending on the binding site of ASA.

== Immunocontraceptive vaccine ==
Immunocontraceptive vaccines with a variety of proposed intervention strategies have been in development and under investigation since the 1970s. Population-level use in wildlife for ecological management has accelerated, with research less constrained by possible outcomes which would be considered unacceptable in humans, such as permanent sterility. Experience and research in the non-human animal context informs the human research that is ongoing, albeit with slower progress.

One approach is a vaccine designed to inhibit the fusing of spermatozoa to the zona pellucida (ZP). Normally in fertilisation, spermatozoa fuse with the zona pellucida surrounding the mature oocyte; the resulting acrosome reaction breaks down the ovum's tough coating so that the sperm and ovum unite. A vaccine targeting this process has been tested in animals with a view to develop an effective contraceptive for humans. This DNA-based vaccine uses cloned ZP cDNA. It results in the production of antibodies against the ZP, which stop the sperm from binding to the zona pellucida and ultimately from fertilizing the ovum.

Another vaccine that has been investigated is one against human chorionic gonadotropin (hCG). In phase I and early phase II human clinical trials, an experimental vaccine consisting of a dimer of β-hCG, with the tetanus toxoid (TT) as an adjuvant, produced antibodies against hCG in the small group of women immunized. The anti-hCG antibodies generated were capable of neutralizing the biological activity of hCG. Without active hCG, maintenance of the uterus in a condition receptive for implantation is not possible, thereby forestalling pregnancy. As only 80% of the women in the study had a level of circulating anti-hCG sufficient to prevent pregnancy, further development of this approach is needed to enhance the immunogenicity of the vaccine, in order that it produces a reliable and consistent immune response in a higher proportion of women. Towards this goal, vaccine variations using a peptide of β-hCG that is uniquely specific to hCG, while absent in other hormones – luteinizing hormone (LH), follicle-stimulating hormone (FSH), and thyroid-stimulating hormone (TSH) – are under investigation in animal models, for their possible enhancement of responses.

== Research progress ==
Challenges to a fuller understanding of human reproductive immunology, including in pregnancy, are research limitations in existing in vitro and in vivo tools, and ethical concerns. Direct human research in this field mostly relies on stem cell culture and technological advancements that allow scientists to conduct research on organoids instead of living human subjects. In 2018, a review study concluded that organoids can be used to model organ development and disease. Other studies have concluded that with further technological advancements, it is possible to create a detailed 3D organoid model of the female reproductive tract which introduces a more efficient method to conduct research and collect data in the fields of drug discovery, basic research and essentially reproductive immunology.

=== Single-cell technologies ===
The maternal-fetal interface has the ability to protect against pathogens by providing reproductive immunity. Simultaneously, it is remodeling the tissues needed for placentation. This unique feature of the maternal-fetal interface suggests that the decidual immunome, or the immune function of the female reproductive tract, is not fully understood, yet.

In order to have a better understanding of Reproductive Immunology, more data needs to be collected and analyzed. Technological advances allow reproductive immunologists to collect increasingly complex data at a cellular resolution. Polychromatic flow cytometry allows for greater resolution in the identifying novel cell types by surface and intracellular protein. Two examples of methods in data acquisition include:

- Flow cytometry - allows rapid assessment of multiple parameters simultaneously for a single cell.
- Single-cell RNAseq coupled with microfluidics – allows for efficient cellular transcriptomics.

Reproductive immunology remains an open area of research as not enough data is available to introduce a significant finding.

=== Cytokine profiling ===
Maternal immune activation can be assessed by measuring multiple cytokines (cytokine profiling) in serum or plasma. This method is safe for the fetus since it only requires a peripheral blood sample from the mother and has been used to map maternal immune development throughout normal pregnancies as well as studying the relationship between immune activation and pregnancy complications or abnormal development of the fetus. Unfortunately, the method itself is unable to determine the sources and the targets of the cytokines and only shows systemic immune activation (as long as peripheral blood is analyzed), and the cytokine profile may vary rapidly as cytokines are short-lived proteins. It is also difficult to establish the exact relation between a cytokine profile and the underlying immunological processes.

The impact of unfavorable immune activation on fetal development and the risk of pregnancy complications is an active field of research. Many studies have reported an association between cytokine levels, especially for inflammatory cytokines, and the risk of developing preeclampsia, although the findings are mixed. However, decreased cytokine levels in early pregnancy has been associated to impaired fetal growth. Increased maternal cytokine levels have also been found to increase the risk of neurodevelopmental disorders such as autism spectrum disorders and depression in the offspring. However, more research is needed before these associations are fully understood.

== See also ==
- Assisted reproductive technology
- Hypertensive disease of pregnancy
- Sexually transmitted diseases
