= Eutherian fetoembryonic defense system hypothesis =

The eutherian fetoembryonic defense system (eu-FEDS) is a hypothetical model describing a method by which immune systems are capable of recognizing additional states of relatedness like "own species" such as is observed in maternal immune tolerance in pregnancy. The model includes descriptions of the proposed signaling mechanism and several proposed examples of exploitation of this signaling in disease states.

== Background ==
The concept of immunity refers to an organism's ability to respond to various foreign intrusions (as occurs in infection). A basic requirement in such a system is the ability to avoid self-harm through some mechanism of recognizing "self". In classic immunity several types of molecules label the organism's own cells as "self". Cells labelled in this manner are tolerated and not damaged by the various defense mechanisms employed to protect against infection. Dysregulation of this system is responsible for several types of disease states known collectively as autoimmune disorders.

The term Eutheria is a taxon describing placental organisms such as mammals. The sister group of Eutheria is Metatheria, which includes marsupials and their extinct relatives.

The term eu-FEDS was first described in 1997 by Gary F. Clark et al. as "the human fetoembryonic defense system", and later renamed to apply more broadly to all members of the taxon Eutheria. In 1949 Frank Burnet, and later in 1953 Peter Medawar, observed that the developing fetus was, in fact, similar to a transplanted "foreign" organ, because of the father's contribution to its genome. In 1960, Medawar and Burnet were awarded the Nobel Prize in part for their early contributions and discoveries related to understanding the necessity for the development of tolerance to the developing eutherian. It is now apparent that a human fetus is tolerated by its birth mother, even when it is completely unrelated. These observations were made following the introduction of modern assisted reproduction technologies involving unrelated donor eggs and the use of in vitro fertilization (IVF). The eu-FEDS hypothesis was itself proposed to describe the precise immunological mechanisms that mediate protection of the developing eutherian fetus from the immune responses of its mother.

== Hypothesis ==
The basic premise of the eu-FEDS hypothesis is that both soluble and cell surface associated glycoproteins, present in the reproductive system and expressed on gametes, suppress any potential immune responses, and inhibit rejection of the fetus. The eu-FEDS model further suggests that specific carbohydrate sequences (oligosaccharides) are covalently linked to these immunosuppressive glycoproteins and act as "functional groups" that suppress the immune response. The major uterine and fetal glycoproteins that are associated with the eu-FEDS model in the human include alpha-fetoprotein, CA125, and glycodelin-A (also known as placental protein 14 (PP14)).

Normally, a low level of these glycoproteins is detected in the maternal serum during the early stages of pregnancy. It appears that the effects of these eu-FEDS associated glycoproteins are manifested only during implantation and the very early development of the embryo. In humans, the expression of such glycoproteins greatly decreases toward the end of the first trimester. Therefore, more highly targeted mechanisms of immune suppression, such as the expression of the enzyme indoleamine dioxygenase (IDO), are likely employed by the fetus during the subsequent stages of development. One potential reason for early inactivation of the system is that the immunosuppressive effect of these glycoproteins may be so complete that their continued leakage into the circulatory system could lead to a global suppression of the maternal immune response, compromising the mother's ability to carry the fetus to term.

== Implications of the hypothesis ==
Human sperm and eggs also lack molecules for the immune recognition of "self". These immune markers are also known as major histocompatibility complex (MHC) antigens or more specifically in humans as human leukocyte antigens (HLA)). Therefore, a major question is how are human gametes recognized by immune effector cells. Specifically, their lack of MHC recognition markers should trigger the immune system, resulting in lysis of both sperm and eggs by leukocytes known as natural killer, or NK cells. These cells target and kill other cells lacking such MHC markers, a concept known as "missing self". One distinct possibility is that sperm and eggs are recognized via oligosaccharides expressed on their surfaces. For example, human gametes are coated with carbohydrate sequences that have been implicated in the suppression of NK cell mediated responses.

One of the major corollaries of the eu-FEDS hypothesis is that persistent pathogens and aggressive tumor cells are able to either mimic or acquire the same carbohydrate functional groups used to suppress any immune response that could interfere with the reproductive imperative, thus enabling them to similarly resist the human immune response. These pathogens include HIV-1, helminthic parasites such as schistosomes, and Helicobacter pylori, the bacterium that causes stomach ulcers.

There are some notable examples of this mimicry or acquisition of the same carbohydrate sequences implicated in this protective system by pathogens and aggressive tumor cells. The major carbohydrate sequence linked to glycodelin-A also profusely coats the surface of schistosomes. The profile of the major oligosaccharides linked to CA125 and the major surface glycoprotein of HIV-1 (gp120) almost perfectly overlap. More persistent pathogens linked to the eu-FEDS model may be identified as mass spectrometry methods for sequencing oligosaccharides become more sensitive.

== Other experimental models ==
Several other models have been developed that seek to address this hypothetical system for immune tolerance, including the depletion of tryptophan via the enzyme indoleamine dioxygenase (IDO) and the expression of the nonclassical MHC class I molecule designated HLA-G. However, genetic deletion of IDO in female mice does not lead to the rejection of their foreign fetal offspring, indicating that a redundant system for the suppression of the mother's immune response exists in the uterus during pregnancy. In addition, HLA-G expresses oligosaccharides that are very different from those linked to other HLA class I molecules, so the possibility exists that HLA-G at the fetomaternal interface is itself employing its unusual carbohydrate sequences as functional groups to suppress the mother's immune response.

== See also ==
- Immune tolerance in pregnancy
