= Unexplained infertility =

Form of infertility

Unexplained infertility is infertility that is idiopathic in the sense that its cause remains unknown even after an infertility work-up, usually including semen analysis in the man and assessment of ovulation and fallopian tubes in the woman. It is usually an exercise in excluding all possible causes before making a diagnosis, however the age of the female partner as well as the duration of infertility are often the most scrutinized characteristics of any infertility case.

== Possible causes ==
In unexplained infertility abnormalities are likely to be present but not detected by current methods. Possible problems could be that the egg is not released at the optimum time for fertilization, that it may not enter the fallopian tube, sperm may not be able to reach the egg, fertilization may fail to occur, transport of the zygote may be disturbed, or implantation fails. It is increasingly recognized that egg quality is of critical importance and women of advanced maternal age have eggs of reduced capacity for normal and successful fertilization. Also, polymorphisms in folate pathway genes could be one reason for fertility complications in some women with unexplained infertility. Aberrant reproductive immunology such as decreased maternal immune tolerance towards the embryo may also be a possible explanation. However, a growing body of evidence suggests that epigenetic modifications in sperm may be partially responsible.

== Prevalence ==
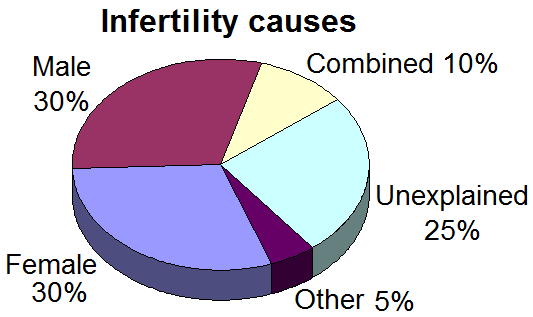
Data from UK, 2009.

Globally, about 10% of infertile couples have unexplained infertility.

== Management ==
Potential methods in unexplained infertility include oral ovarian stimulation agents (such as clomifene citrate, anastrozole or letrozole) as well as intrauterine insemination (IUI), intracervical insemination (ICI) and in vitro fertilization (IVF).

In women who have not had previous treatment, ovarian stimulation combined with IUI achieves approximately the same live birth rate as IVF. On the other hand, in women who have had previous unsuccessful treatment, IVF achieves a live birth rate approximately 2–3 times greater than ovarian stimulation combined with IUI.

IUI and ICI has higher pregnancy rates when combined with ovarian stimulation in couples with unexplained infertility, for IUI being 13% unstimulated and 15% stimulated, and for ICI being 8% unstimulated and 15% stimulated. However, the rate of twin birth increases substantially with IUI or ICI combined with ovarian stimulation, for IUI being 6% unstimulated and 23% stimulated, and for ICI being 6% unstimulated and 23% stimulated.

According to NICE guidelines, oral ovarian stimulation agents should not be given to women with unexplained infertility. Rather, it is recommended that in vitro fertilization should be offered to women with unexplained infertility when they have not conceived after two years of regular unprotected sexual intercourse. IVF avails for embryo transfer of the appropriate number of embryos to give good chances of pregnancy with minimal risk of multiple birth.

A review of randomized studies came to the result that IVF in couples with a high chance of natural conception, as compared to IUI/ICI with or without ovarian stimulation, was more effective in three studies and less effective in two studies.

There is no evidence for an increased risk of ovarian hyperstimulation syndrome (OHSS) with IVF when compared with ovarian stimulation combined with IUI.

== Prognosis ==
Prognosis in unexplained infertility depends on many factors, but can roughly be estimated by e.g. the Hunault model, which takes into account female age, duration of infertility/subfertility, infertility/subfertility being primary or secondary, percentage of motile sperm and being referred by a general practitioner or gynecologist.

== See also ==
- Male infertility
- Female infertility
