= Mir-589 microRNA precursor family =

mir-589

Identifiers
- Symbol: mir-589
- Rfam: RF00987
- miRBase family: MIPF0000496

Other data
- RNA type: microRNA
- Domain(s): Eukaryota;
- PDB structures: PDBe

In molecular biology mir-589 microRNA is a short RNA molecule. MicroRNAs function to regulate the expression levels of other genes by several mechanisms.

== Molecular targets ==
miR-589 has been implicated in the regulation of antimicrobial targets in bovine lung alveolar macrophages, and alongside other miRNAs has been suggested to play a part in the immune response against Mycobacterium tuberculosis. It has additionally been linked to HLA-G expression, having been found to target the 3'UTR 14-base pair sequence region of the HLA-G gene.

== See also ==
- MicroRNA
