= KIR2DL4 =

Protein-coding gene in the species Homo sapiens

Identifiers
- Aliases: KIR2DL4, CD158D, G9P, KIR-103AS, KIR103, KIR103AS, KIR, KIR-2DL4, killer cell immunoglobulin like receptor, two Ig domains and long cytoplasmic tail 4
- External IDs: OMIM: 604945; GeneCards: KIR2DL4
Available structures
PDB	Human UniProt search: PDBe RCSB
PDB	List of PDB id codes 3WYR

Gene location (Human)
Chr.	Chromosome 19 (human)
Band	19q13.42	Start	54,803,611 bp
Band	19q13.42	End	54,814,517 bp
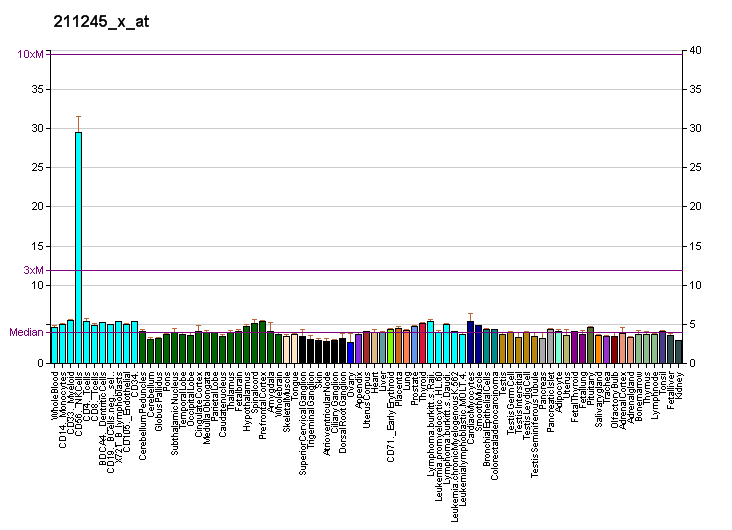

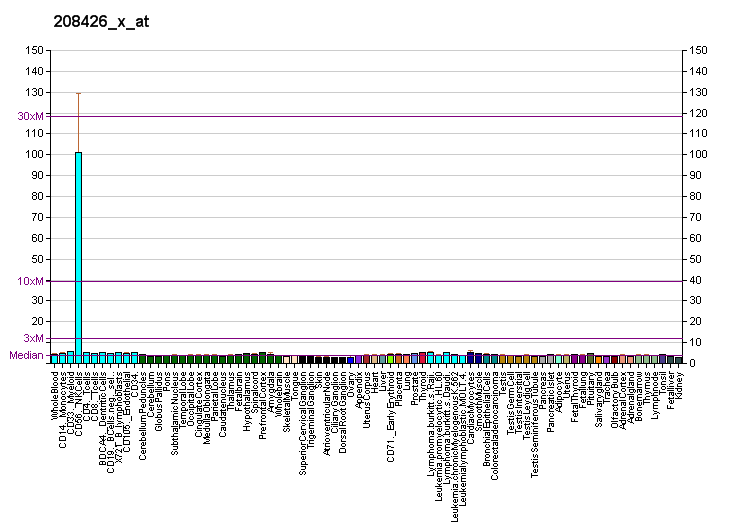

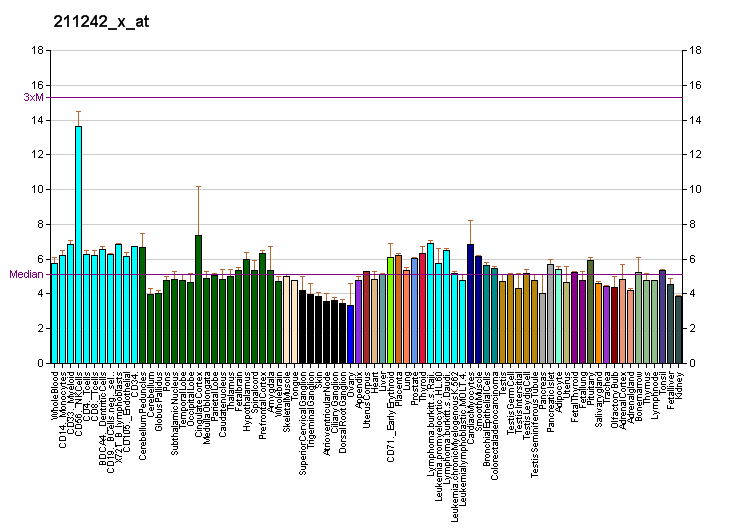
RNA expression pattern
Bgee	Human / Mouse (ortholog); Top expressed in: testicle; spleen; granulocyte; mucosa of transverse colon; blood; right lung; rectum; duodenum; epithelium of colon; appendix / n/a; More reference expression data
BioGPS	More reference expression data
Gene ontology
Molecular function	protein binding; transmembrane signaling receptor activity; MHC class Ib receptor activity
Cellular component	integral component of membrane; plasma membrane; integral component of plasma membrane; membrane; endosome; early endosome membrane
Biological process	cellular defense response; signal transduction; regulation of immune response; positive regulation of natural killer cell cytokine production; negative regulation of natural killer cell mediated cytotoxicity; positive regulation of cellular senescence
Sources:Amigo / QuickGO
Orthologs
Databases	NCBI: entry; OMA: entry
Species	Human	Mouse
Entrez	3805	n/a
Ensembl	ENSG00000274945; ENSG00000278606; ENSG00000277540; ENSG00000273575; ENSG00000275732 ENSG00000275699; ENSG00000275317; ENSG00000284509; ENSG00000277750; ENSG00000284365; ENSG00000275848; ENSG00000275456; ENSG00000274955; ENSG00000277964; ENSG00000277362; ENSG00000276979; ENSG00000283961; ENSG00000277850; ENSG00000284460; ENSG00000278074; ENSG00000277076; ENSG00000274189; ENSG00000276044; ENSG00000276779; ENSG00000277355; ENSG00000283869; ENSG00000278201; ENSG00000278271; ENSG00000275237; ENSG00000189013; ENSG00000273498; ENSG00000274193; ENSG00000278430; ENSG00000274232; ENSG00000274609; ENSG00000284013; ENSG00000283986; ENSG00000284340; ENSG00000284562; ENSG00000284206; ENSG00000284457	n/a
UniProt	Q99706	n/a
RefSeq (mRNA)	NM_002255; NM_001080770; NM_001080772; NM_001258383	n/a
RefSeq (protein)	NP_001074239; NP_001074241; NP_002246	n/a
Location (UCSC)	Chr 19: 54.8 – 54.81 Mb	n/a
PubMed search		n/a
- Wikidata
View/Edit Human

Killer cell immunoglobulin-like receptor 2DL4 is a protein that in humans is encoded by the KIR2DL4 gene.

== Function ==
Killer cell immunoglobulin-like receptors (KIRs) are transmembrane glycoproteins expressed by natural killer cells and subsets of CD8+ T cells. The KIR genes are polymorphic and highly homologous and they are found in a cluster on chromosome 19q13.4 within the 1 Mb leukocyte receptor complex (LRC). The gene content of the KIR gene cluster varies among haplotypes, although several "framework" genes are found in all haplotypes (KIR3DL3, KIR3DP1, KIR2DL4, KIR3DL2). The KIR proteins are classified by the number of extracellular immunoglobulin domains (2D or 3D) and by whether they have a long (L) or short (S) cytoplasmic domain. KIR proteins with the long cytoplasmic domain transduce inhibitory signals upon ligand binding via an immune tyrosine-based inhibitory motif (ITIM), while KIR proteins with the short cytoplasmic domain lack the ITIM motif and instead associate with the TYRO protein tyrosine kinase binding protein to transduce activating signals. The ligands for several KIR proteins are subsets of HLA class I molecules; thus, KIR proteins are thought to play an important role in regulation of the immune response. This gene is one of the "framework" loci that is present on all haplotypes. Alternative splicing results in multiple transcript variants.

The only so far reported ligand of KIR2DL4 is the non-classical HLA class 1 gene HLA-G, leading to the inhibition of the cytolytic NK cell function.

== See also ==
- Cluster of differentiation
