= PIBF1 =

Protein-coding gene in the species Homo sapiens

Identifiers
- Aliases: PIBF1, C13orf24, CEP90, PIBF, progesterone immunomodulatory binding factor 1, JBTS33
- External IDs: OMIM: 607532; MGI: 1261910; GeneCards: PIBF1

Gene location (Mouse)
Chr.	Chromosome 14 (mouse)
Band	14 E2.2|14 49.27 cM	Start	99,336,860 bp
Band	14 E2.2|14 49.27 cM	End	99,491,929 bp
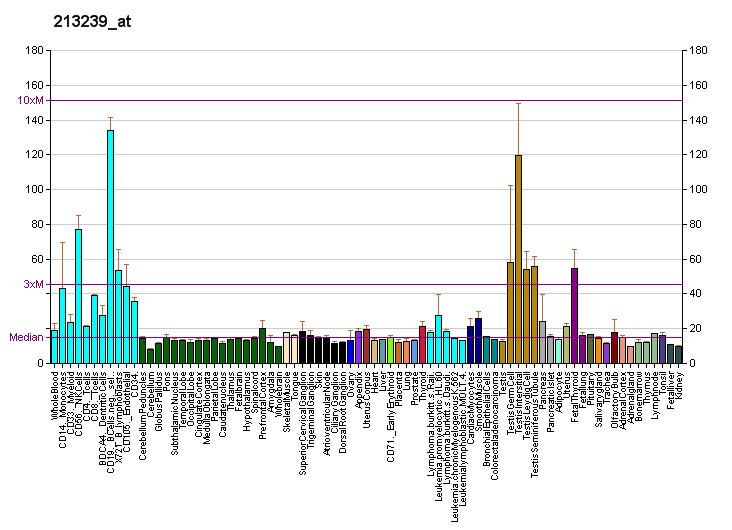
RNA expression pattern
Bgee	Human / Mouse (ortholog); Top expressed in: Achilles tendon; sural nerve; bronchial epithelial cell; ganglionic eminence; right lobe of thyroid gland; stromal cell of endometrium; right uterine tube; left lobe of thyroid gland; anterior pituitary; canal of the cervix / Top expressed in: spermatocyte; spermatid; zygote; genital tubercle; tail of embryo; secondary oocyte; seminiferous tubule; morula; blastocyst; granulocyte; More reference expression data
BioGPS	More reference expression data
Gene ontology
Molecular function	interleukin-4 receptor binding; protein binding
Cellular component	cytoplasm; centrosome; centriolar satellite; extracellular region; cytoskeleton; nucleus; extracellular space; microtubule organizing center
Biological process	negative regulation of natural killer cell activation; positive regulation of interleukin-10 production; immune system process; mitotic spindle assembly; protein localization to centrosome; mitotic metaphase plate congression; negative regulation of prostaglandin biosynthetic process; negative regulation of interleukin-12 production; non-motile cilium assembly; positive regulation of tyrosine phosphorylation of STAT protein; negative regulation of tyrosine phosphorylation of STAT protein; activation of Janus kinase activity; cilium assembly
Sources:Amigo / QuickGO
Orthologs
Databases	NCBI: entry
Species	Human	Mouse
Entrez	10464	52023
Ensembl	n/a	ENSMUSG00000022064
UniProt	Q8WXW3	n/a
RefSeq (mRNA)	NM_006346; NM_001349655	NM_029320; NM_029454
RefSeq (protein)	NP_006337; NP_001336584	n/a
Location (UCSC)	n/a	Chr 14: 99.34 – 99.49 Mb
PubMed search
- Wikidata
View/Edit Human	View/Edit Mouse

Progesterone-induced-blocking factor 1 is a protein that in humans is encoded by the PIBF1 gene. It has been shown to localize to the centrosome and has also been named CEP90.
