= PRR23C =

Protein-coding gene in the species Homo sapiens

Identifiers
- Aliases: PRR23C, proline rich 23C
- External IDs: MGI: 3645937; GeneCards: PRR23C

Gene location (Human)
| Chr. | Chromosome 3 (human) |
| Band | 3q23 | Start | 139,042,102 bp |
| Band | 3q23 | End | 139,044,892 bp |

Gene location (Mouse)
| Chr. | Chromosome 9 (mouse) |
| Band | 9|9 E3.3 | Start | 98,738,547 bp |
| Band | 9|9 E3.3 | End | 98,739,427 bp |
RNA expression pattern
| Bgee | Human / Mouse (ortholog); Top expressed in: gonad; testicle; right testis; left testis; stomach / Top expressed in: embryo; zygote; secondary oocyte; primary oocyte; More reference expression data |
| BioGPS | n/a |
Orthologs
| Databases | NCBI: entry; OMA: entry |
| Species | Human | Mouse |
| Entrez | 389152 | 623186 |
| Ensembl | ENSG00000233701 | ENSMUSG00000063058 |
| UniProt | Q6ZRP0 | D3YWX5 |
| RefSeq (mRNA) | NM_001134657; NM_001004315 | NM_001134661 |
| RefSeq (protein) | NP_001128129 | NP_001128133 |
| Location (UCSC) | Chr 3: 139.04 – 139.04 Mb | Chr 9: 98.74 – 98.74 Mb |
| PubMed search |
- Wikidata
| View/Edit Human | View/Edit Mouse |

Proline-rich protein 23C is a protein that in humans is encoded by the proline-rich 23C (PRR23C) gene.

== Gene ==
PRR23C Homo sapiens is located on the long arm of chromosome 3, (3q23) on the antisense strand. When pertaining to the mRNA of PRR23C Homo sapiens, it is 2,791 bp in length. PRR23C Homo sapiens has one exon covering the entire length of mRNA (1-2,791 bp). PRR23C Homo sapiens has a clone name of FLJ46210.

=== Expression ===
PRR23C Homo sapiens is expressed in the testis. Ottolini et al. (2014) discussed the PRR23 family to which they revealed that through RNA sequencing data, that PRR23A, PRR23B and PRR23C are testis-specific genes. Ottolini et al. (2014) believes that this family may be a crucial part for the male reproductive system given their RNA-seq data findings.

== Protein ==
Proline-rich protein 23C Homo sapiens is 262 amino acids long with a calculated molecular weight of 27,674 Da. Proline-rich protein 23C Homo sapiens has a domain of unknown function (DUF2476) that spans the majority of the protein (1-259 aa) which is a conserved domain. DUF2476 belongs to pfam10630 which is a part of superfamily c|11241. DUF2476 is a family of proteins that are rich in proline residues and have unknown function. Proline-rich protein 23C is the preferred name but other aliases include proline-rich protein 23A.

=== Protein composition ===
Proline is predicted to be the most abundant amino acid in proline-rich protein 23C Homo sapiens. In comparison to the prevalence of amino acids in other human proteins, it is predicted that proline-rich protein 23C Homo sapiens has a higher abundance of proline along with very low abundances of asparagine, threonine, and lysine. Orthologs for this protein are predicted to also have a high abundance of proline.

=== Isoelectric point ===
The basal isoelectric point for PRR23C Homo sapiens was 4.48 (pH) according to phoshosite.org.

=== Sub-cellular localization ===
Proline-rich protein 23C is predicted to localize to the nucleus for the human protein and its orthologs. There are predicted nuclear localization signals seen in both the human proline-rich protein 23C and its orthologs.

== Homology ==
=== Orthologs ===
PRR23C Homo sapiens is strictly conserved in mammals. The table below lists mammalian orthologs for PRR23C Homo sapiens .

| Genus & Species | Common name | Accession number | Seq. Length | Seq. Identity | Seq. Similarity |
|---|---|---|---|---|---|
| Homo sapiens | Human | NP_001128129.1 | 262 aa | 100% | 100% |
| Pan troglodytes | Chimpanzee | XP_003310067.1 | 263 aa | 98.50% | 98% |
| Gorilla gorilla gorilla | Western lowland gorilla | XP_004037787.1 | 263 aa | 96.60% | 98% |
| Pongo pygmaeus | Bornean orangutan | XP_002814147.1 | 263 aa | 94.70% | 95% |
| Nomascus leucogenys | Northern white-cheeked gibbon | XP_003265349.1 | 262 aa | 94.70% | 95% |
| Chlorocebus sabaeus | Green monkey | XP_008007123.1 | 263 aa | 92% | 94% |
| Rhinopithecus roxellana | Golden snub-nosed monkey | XP_010365056.1 | 263 aa | 91.60% | 93% |
| Papio anubis | Olive baboon | XP_003895087.1 | 263 aa | 94.70% | 93% |
| Callithrix jacchus | Common marmoset | XP_002759594.1 | 248 aa | 72.90% | 77% |
| Otolemur garnettii | Northern greater galago | XP_003789481.1 | 267 aa | 66.50% | 71% |
| Ceratotherium simum simum | White rhinoceros | XP_004419371.1 | 263 aa | 63.70% | 75% |
| Pteropus alecto | Black flying fox | XP_006907344.1 | 268 aa | 50.90% | 68% |
| Myotis lucifugus | Little brown bat | XP_006083994.1 | 257 aa | 61.20% | 64% |
| Bubalus bubalis | Water buffalo | XP_006070045.1 | 258 aa | 55.40% | 62% |
| Bison bison bison | American bison | XP_010856601.1 | 258 aa | 51.90% | 61% |
| Bos mutus | Yak | XP_005909007.1 | 258 aa | 51.50% | 61% |
| Lipotes vexillifer | Baiji | XP_007458979.1 | 260 aa | 51.50% | 64% |
| Tursiops truncatus | Common bottlenose dolphin | XP_004330081.1 | 261 aa | 54.50% | 61% |
| Balaenoptera acutorostrata scammoni | Minke whale | XP_007170446.1 | 255 aa | 53.60% | 61% |
| Physeter catodon | Sperm whale | XP_007117538.1 | 260 aa | 53.80% | 64% |
| Peromyscus maniculatus bairdii | Prairie deer mouse | XP_006975251.1 | 266 aa | 50.90% | 60% |

=== Paralogs ===
There were two paralogs found for PRR23C Homo sapiens: PRR23B and PRR23A. Both have similar sequence identities with PRR23B having 86% identity and PRR23A having 85% identity.
