= Sperm-associated antigen 1 =

Protein-coding gene in the species Homo sapiens

SPAG1

Identifiers
- Aliases: SPAG1, CILD28, CT140, HSD-3.8, SP75, TPIS, HEL-S-268, sperm associated antigen 1, DNAAF13
- External IDs: OMIM: 603395; MGI: 1349387; GeneCards: SPAG1

Gene location (Human)
Chr.	Chromosome 8 (human)
Band	8q22.2	Start	100,157,906 bp
Band	8q22.2	End	100,259,278 bp

Gene location (Mouse)
Chr.	Chromosome 15 (mouse)
Band	15|15 B3.1	Start	36,178,245 bp
Band	15|15 B3.1	End	36,235,767 bp
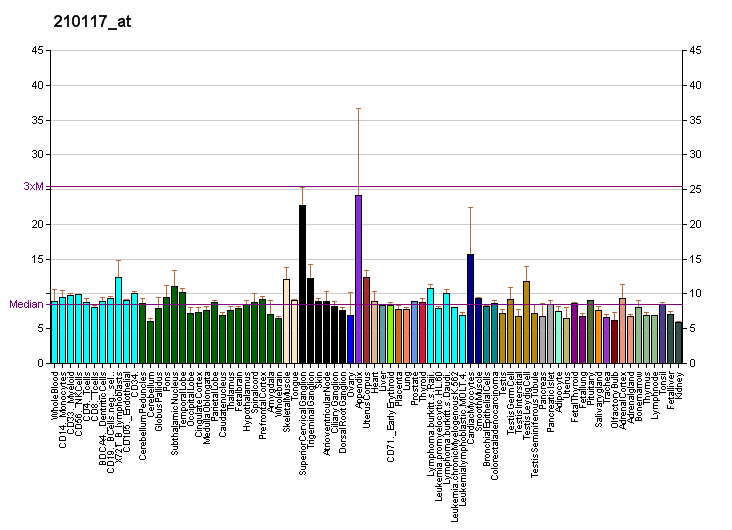
RNA expression pattern
Bgee	Human / Mouse (ortholog); Top expressed in: bronchial epithelial cell; mucosa of sigmoid colon; palpebral conjunctiva; olfactory zone of nasal mucosa; rectum; mucosa of paranasal sinus; right uterine tube; epithelium of colon; skin of thigh; oral cavity / Top expressed in: zygote; secondary oocyte; spermatocyte; spermatid; primary oocyte; motor neuron; facial motor nucleus; lumbar subsegment of spinal cord; cerebellar cortex; seminiferous tubule; More reference expression data
BioGPS	More reference expression data
Gene ontology
Molecular function	nucleotide binding; GTP binding; hydrolase activity
Cellular component	cytoplasm; cytosol
Biological process	axonemal dynein complex assembly; single fertilization
Sources:Amigo / QuickGO
Orthologs
Databases	NCBI: entry; OMA: entry
Species	Human	Mouse
Entrez	6674	26942
Ensembl	ENSG00000104450	ENSMUSG00000037617
UniProt	Q07617	Q80ZX8
RefSeq (mRNA)	NM_003114; NM_172218; NM_001374321	NM_012031; NM_001359980; NM_001359981; NM_001359982; NM_001359983 NM_001359984
RefSeq (protein)	NP_003105; NP_757367; NP_001361250	NP_036161; NP_001346909; NP_001346910; NP_001346911; NP_001346912 NP_001346913
Location (UCSC)	Chr 8: 100.16 – 100.26 Mb	Chr 15: 36.18 – 36.24 Mb
PubMed search
- Wikidata
View/Edit Human	View/Edit Mouse

Sperm-associated antigen 1 is a protein that in humans is encoded by the SPAG1 gene.

== Function ==
The correlation of anti-sperm antibodies with cases of unexplained infertility implicates a role for these antibodies in blocking fertilization. Improved diagnosis and treatment of immunologic infertility, as well as identification of proteins for targeted contraception, are dependent on the identification and characterization of relevant sperm antigens.

The protein expressed by this gene is recognized by anti-sperm agglutinating antibodies from an infertile woman. Furthermore, immunization of female rats with the recombinant human protein reduced fertility. This protein localizes to the plasma membrane of germ cells in the testis and to the post-acrosomal plasma membrane of mature spermatozoa.

Recombinant polypeptide binds GTP and exhibits GTPase activity. Thus, this protein may regulate GTP signal transduction pathways involved in spermatogenesis and fertilization. Two transcript variants of this gene encode the same protein.
