= Immune tolerance in pregnancy =

Tolerance of a fetus during pregnancy

Immune tolerance in pregnancy or maternal immune tolerance is the immune tolerance shown towards the fetus and placenta during pregnancy. This tolerance counters the immune response that would normally result in the rejection of something foreign in the body, as can happen in cases of spontaneous abortion. It is studied within the field of reproductive immunology.

== Mechanisms ==
=== Placental mechanisms ===
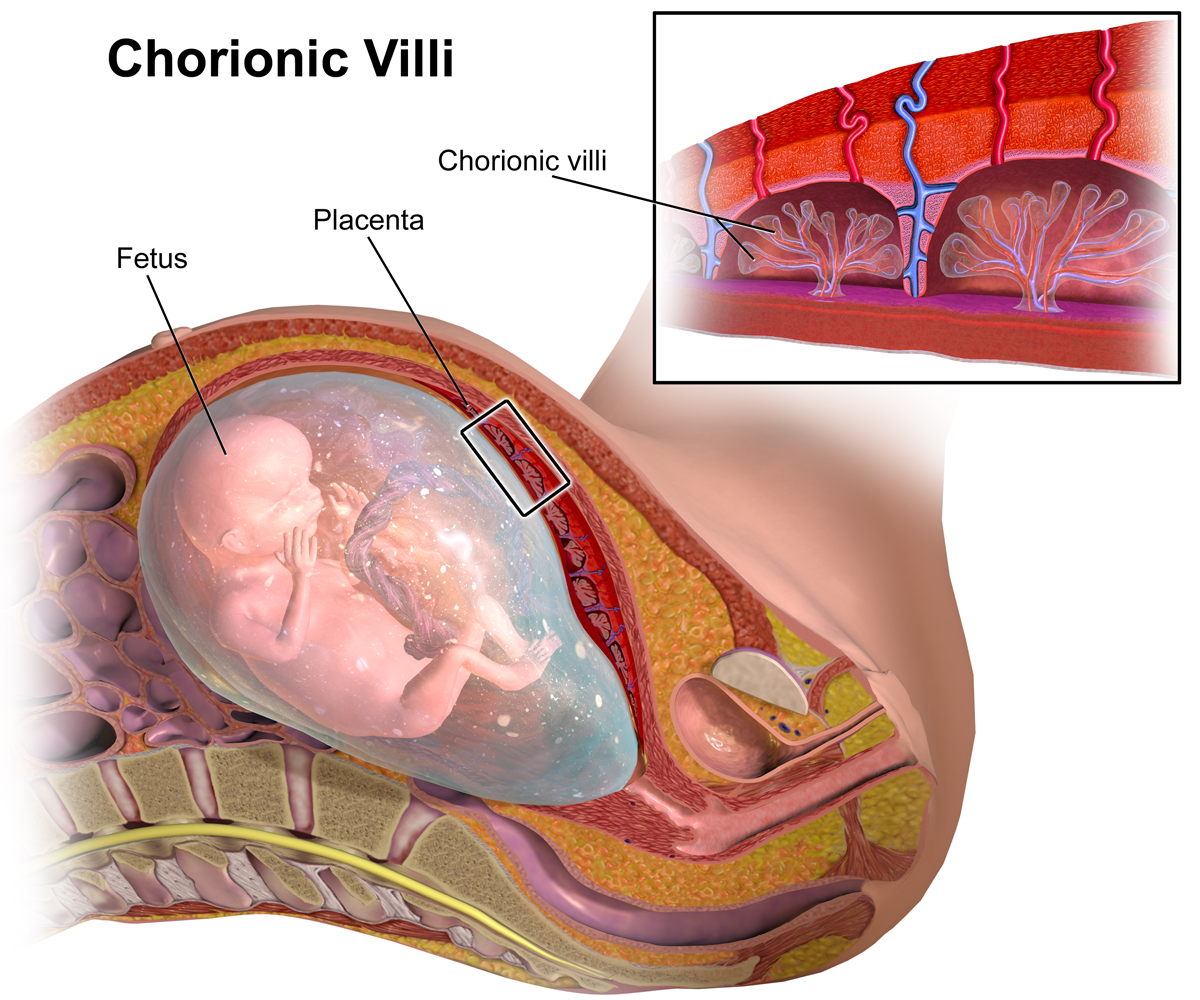
The placenta functions as an immunological barrier between the mother and the fetus.

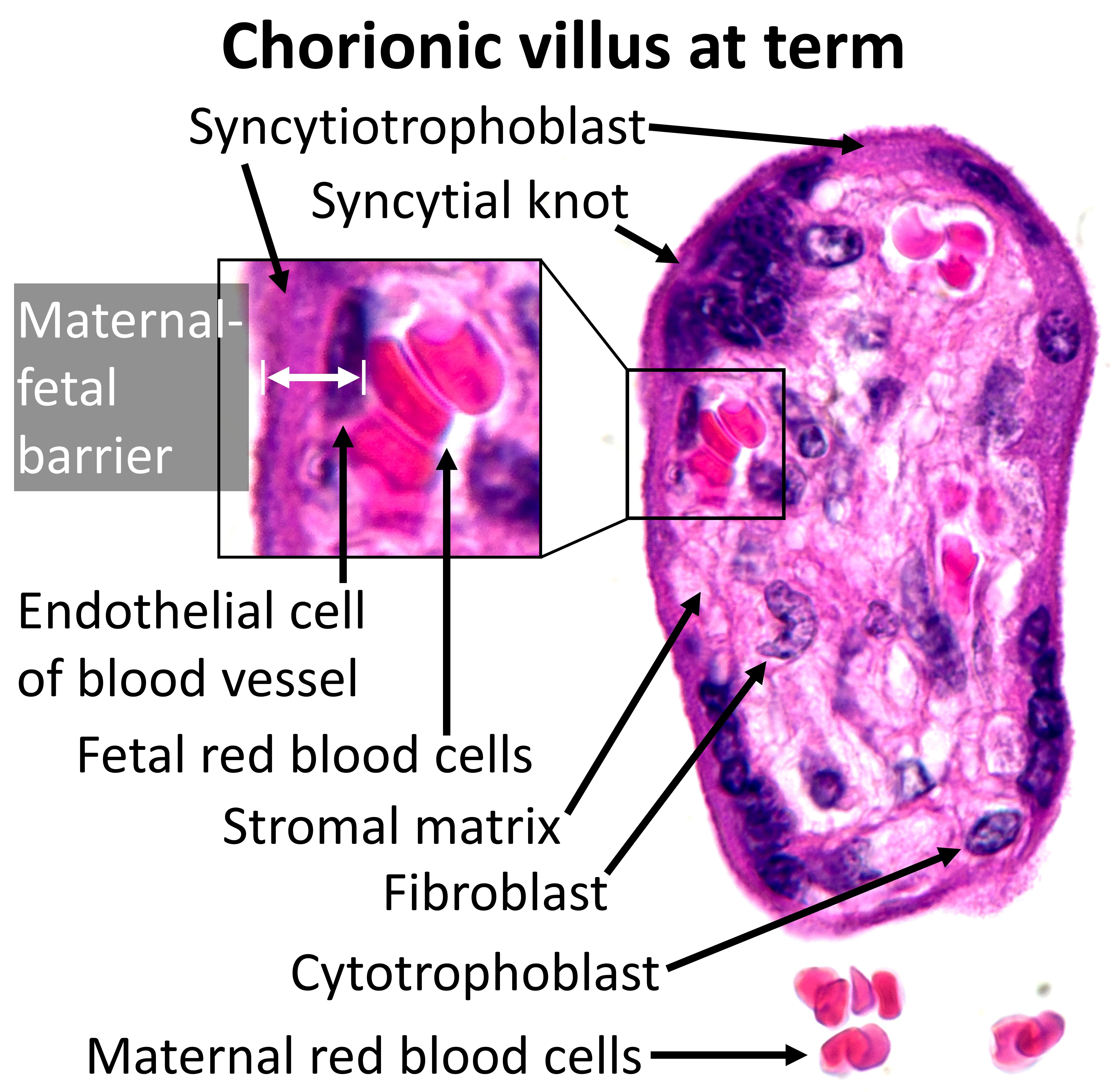
High-magnification H&E micrograph of a chorionic villus of the placenta at term with main cell types. Insert shows the syncytiotrophoblast and endothelial cells which are the main components of the barrier that separate fetal red blood cells from the maternal red blood cells surrounding the villi.

The placenta functions as an immunological barrier between the mother and the fetus, creating an immunologically privileged site. For this purpose, it uses several mechanisms:

- It secretes neurokinin B containing phosphocholine molecules. This is the same mechanism used by parasitic nematodes to avoid detection by the immune system of their host.
- Also, there is the presence of small lymphocytic suppressor cells in the fetus that inhibit maternal cytotoxic T cells by inhibiting the response to interleukin 2.
- The placental trophoblast cells do not express the classical MHC class I isotypes HLA-A and HLA-B, unlike most other cells in the body, and this absence is assumed to prevent destruction by maternal cytotoxic T cells, which otherwise would recognize the fetal HLA-A and HLA-B molecules as foreign. On the other hand, they do express the atypical MHC class I isotypes HLA-E and HLA-G, which is assumed to prevent destruction by maternal natural killer cells, which otherwise destroy cells that do not express any MHC class I. However, trophoblast cells do express the rather typical HLA-C.
- It forms a syncytium without any extracellular spaces between cells in order to limit the exchange of migratory immune cells between the developing embryo and the body of the mother (something an epithelium will not do sufficiently, as certain blood cells are specialized to be able to insert themselves between adjacent epithelial cells). The fusion of the cells is apparently caused by viral fusion proteins from endosymbiotic endogenous retrovirus. An immunoevasive action was the initial normal behavior of the viral protein, in order to avail for the virus to spread to other cells by simply merging them with the infected one. It is believed that the ancestors of modern viviparous mammals evolved after an infection by this virus, enabling the fetus to better resist the immune system of the mother.

Still, the placenta does allow maternal immunoglobulin G (IgG) to pass to the fetus to protect it against infections. However, these antibodies do not target fetal cells, unless any fetal material has escaped across the placenta where it can come in contact with maternal B cells and make those B cells start to produce antibodies against fetal targets. The mother does produce antibodies against foreign ABO blood types, where the fetal blood cells are possible targets, but these preformed antibodies are usually of the immunoglobulin M type, and therefore usually do not cross the placenta. Still, rarely, ABO incompatibility can give rise to IgG antibodies that cross the placenta, and are caused by sensitization of mothers (usually of blood type O) to antigens in foods or bacteria that are homologous to A and B antigens.

=== Other mechanisms ===
Still, the placental barrier is not the sole means to evade the immune system, as foreign fetal cells also persist in the maternal circulation, on the other side of the placental barrier.

The placenta does not block maternal IgG antibodies, which thereby may pass through the human placenta, providing immune protection to the fetus against infectious diseases.

One model for the induction of tolerance during the very early stages of pregnancy is the eutherian fetoembryonic defense system (eu-FEDS) hypothesis. The basic premise of the eu-FEDS hypothesis is that both soluble and cell surface associated glycoproteins, present in the reproductive system and expressed on gametes, suppress any potential immune responses, and inhibit rejection of the fetus. The eu-FEDS model further suggests that specific carbohydrate sequences (oligosaccharides) are covalently linked to these immunosuppressive glycoproteins and act as "functional groups" that suppress the immune response. The major uterine and fetal glycoproteins that are associated with the eu-FEDS model in the human include alpha-fetoprotein, CA125, and glycodelin-A (also known as placental protein 14).

Regulatory T cells also likely play a role. As a fetus forms, it is seen similarly to an organ transplant due to it being semi-allogenic, having genetic material different to the mother. Since the fetus has partial paternal genetic material, it inherits paternal flags, called HLA alleles, that trigger the maternal adaptive immune system and are responded to by fighter Cytotoxic T cells and peacekeeping Regulatory T cells (Treg). In order for the foreign paternal fetal material to be accepted and unharmed by the maternal immune system, the Regulatory T-cells must keep a balance with the cytotoxic T-cells, overriding autoimmune attacks.

Another participant in the balance of both T-cells is Indoleamine 2,3-dioxygenase (IDO) which originates from Trophoblast cells and causes cell cycle arrest in T-cells, preventing them from differentiating into effector or fighter T-cells. IDO is transformed by factors produced by Trophoblast cells and suppresses T-cell activation. Results from a study reveals that women with recurrent pregnancy loss have reduced levels of Treg cells. This shows that insufficient Treg cells are unable to balance cytotoxic T cells and their attacks, causing the maternal immune system to treat fetal material as foreign, destroying it.

Also, a shift from cell-mediated immunity toward humoral immunity is believed to occur.

== Insufficient tolerance ==
Many cases of spontaneous abortion may be described in the same way as maternal transplant rejection, and a chronic insufficient tolerance may cause infertility. Other examples of insufficient immune tolerance in pregnancy are Rh disease and pre-eclampsia:

- Rh disease is caused by the mother producing antibodies (including IgG antibodies) against the Rhesus D antigen on their baby's red blood cells. It occurs if the mother is Rh negative and the baby is Rh positive, and a small amount of Rh positive blood from any previous pregnancy has entered the mother's circulation to make their bodies produce IgG antibodies against the D antigen (Anti-D). Maternal IgG is able to pass through the placenta into the fetus and if the level of it is sufficient, it will cause destruction of D positive fetal red blood cells, leading to development of the anti-Rh type of hemolytic disease of the fetus and newborn (HDFN). Generally, HDFN becomes worse with each additional Rh incompatible pregnancy.
- One cause of pre-eclampsia is an abnormal immune response towards the placenta. There is substantial evidence for exposure to partner's semen as prevention for pre-eclampsia, largely due to the absorption of several immune modulating factors present in seminal fluid.

Pregnancies resulting from egg donation, where the carrier is less genetically similar to the fetus than a biological mother, are associated with a higher incidence of pregnancy-induced hypertension and placental pathology. The local and systemic immunologic changes are also more pronounced than in normal pregnancies, so it has been suggested that the higher frequency of some conditions in egg donation may be caused by reduced immune tolerance from the mother.

=== Infertility and miscarriage ===
Immunological responses could be the cause in many cases of infertility and miscarriage. Some immunological factors that contribute to infertility are reproductive autoimmune failure syndrome, the presence of antiphospholipid antibodies, and antinuclear antibodies.

Antiphospholipid antibodies are targeted toward the phospholipids of the cell membrane. Studies have shown that antibodies against phosphatidylserine, phosphatidylcholine, phosphatidylglycerol, phosphatidylinositol and phosphatidylethanolamine target the pre-embryo. Antibodies against phosphatidylserine and phosphatidylethanolamine are against the trophoblast. These phospholipids are essential in enabling the cells of the fetus to remain attached to the cells of the uterus with implantation. If a female has antibodies against these phospholipids, they will be destroyed through the immune response and ultimately the fetus will not be able to remain bound to the uterus. These antibodies also jeopardize the health of the uterus by altering the blood flow to the uterus.

Antinuclear antibodies cause an inflammation in the uterus that does not allow it to be a suitable host for implantation of the embryo. Natural killer cells misinterpret the fetal cells as cancer cells and attack them. An individual that presents with reproductive autoimmune failure syndrome has unexplained infertility, endometriosis, and repetitive miscarriages due to elevated levels of antinuclear antibodies circulating. Both the presence of antiphospholipids antibodies and antinuclear antibodies have toxic effects on the implantation of embryos. This does not apply to anti-thyroid antibodies. Elevated levels do not have a toxic effect, but they are indicative of a risk of miscarriage. Elevated anti-thyroid antibodies act as a marker for females who have T-lymphocyte dysfunction because these levels indicate T cells that are secreting high levels of cytokines that induce inflammation in the uterine wall.

Still, there is currently no drug that has evidence of preventing miscarriage by inhibition of maternal immune responses; aspirin has no effect in this case.

== Increased infectious susceptibility ==
The increased immune tolerance is believed to be a major contributing factor to an increased susceptibility and severity of infections in pregnancy. Pregnant women are more severely affected by, for example, influenza, hepatitis E, herpes simplex and malaria. The evidence is more limited for coccidioidomycosis, measles, smallpox, and varicella. Pregnancy does not appear to alter the protective effects of vaccination.
