= Sperm-associated antigen 8 =

Protein-coding gene in the species Homo sapiens

SPAG8

Identifiers
- Aliases: SPAG8, BS-84, CILD28, CT142, HSD-1, SMP1, SPAG3, hSMP-1, sperm associated antigen 8
- External IDs: OMIM: 605731; MGI: 3056295; HomoloGene: 8250; GeneCards: SPAG8; OMA:SPAG8 - orthologs

Gene location (Human)
Chr.	Chromosome 9 (human)
Band	9p13.3	Start	35,808,045 bp
Band	9p13.3	End	35,812,272 bp

Gene location (Mouse)
Chr.	Chromosome 4 (mouse)
Band	4|4 A5	Start	43,651,335 bp
Band	4|4 A5	End	43,653,594 bp
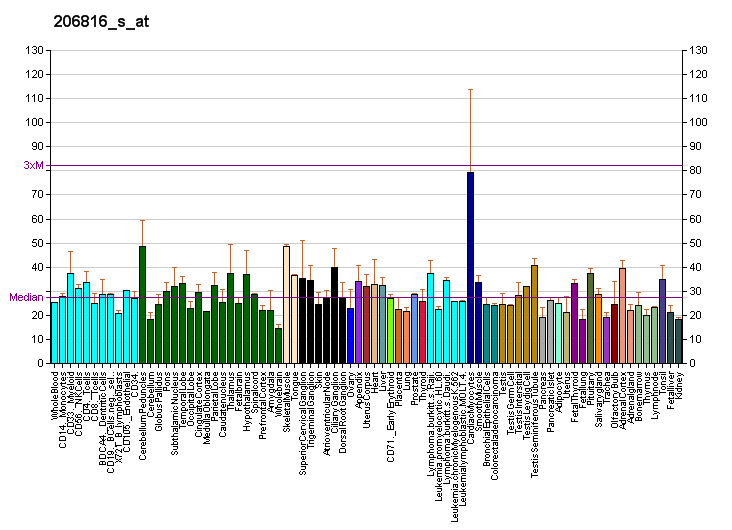

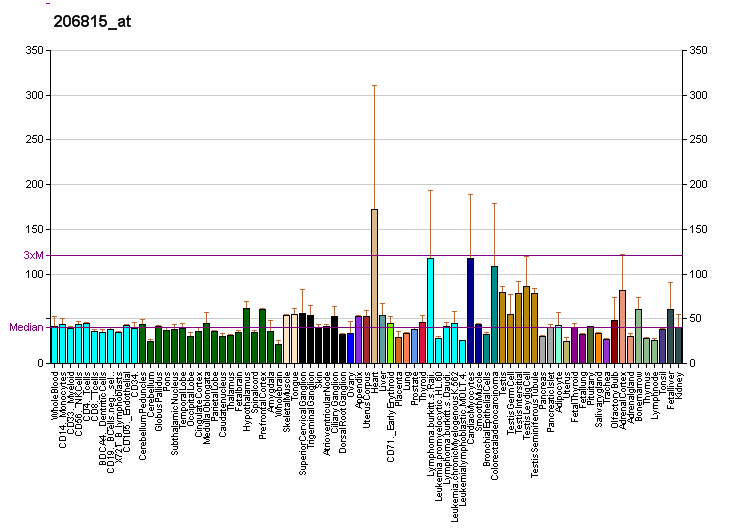
RNA expression pattern
Bgee	Human / Mouse (ortholog); Top expressed in: right uterine tube; tendon of biceps brachii; olfactory zone of nasal mucosa; left testis; right testis; bronchial epithelial cell; mucosa of paranasal sinus; Epithelium of choroid plexus; anterior pituitary; buccal mucosa cell / Top expressed in: spermatid; spermatocyte; seminiferous tubule; embryo; embryo; otolith organ; utricle; olfactory epithelium; right lung lobe; Epithelium of choroid plexus; More reference expression data
BioGPS	More reference expression data
Gene ontology
Molecular function	protein binding; molecular function; microtubule binding
Cellular component	acrosomal vesicle; membrane; cytoplasmic vesicle; cytoskeleton; cytoplasm; nucleus; spindle
Biological process	single fertilization; cell differentiation; spermatogenesis; cell cycle; biological process; positive regulation of transcription by RNA polymerase II
Sources:Amigo / QuickGO
Orthologs
Species	Human	Mouse
Entrez	26206	433700
Ensembl	ENSG00000137098	ENSMUSG00000066196
UniProt	Q99932	Q3V0Q6
RefSeq (mRNA)	NM_001039592; NM_012436; NM_172312	NM_001007463; NM_001290462
RefSeq (protein)	NP_001034681; NP_758516; NP_001353689	NP_001007464; NP_001277391
Location (UCSC)	Chr 9: 35.81 – 35.81 Mb	Chr 4: 43.65 – 43.65 Mb
PubMed search
- Wikidata
View/Edit Human	View/Edit Mouse

Sperm-associated antigen 8 is a protein that in humans is encoded by the SPAG8 gene.

The correlation of anti-sperm antibodies with cases of unexplained infertility implicates a role for these antibodies in blocking fertilization. Improved diagnosis and treatment of immunologic infertility, as well as identification of proteins for targeted contraception, are dependent on the identification and characterization of relevant sperm antigens. The protein encoded by this gene is recognized by sperm agglutinating antibodies from an infertile woman. This protein is localized in germ cells of the testis at all stages of spermatogenesis and is localized to the acrosomal region of mature spermatozoa. Alternatively spliced variants that encode different protein isoforms have been described but the full-length sequences of only two have been determined.
