= HLA-G =

Mammalian proteins found in humans

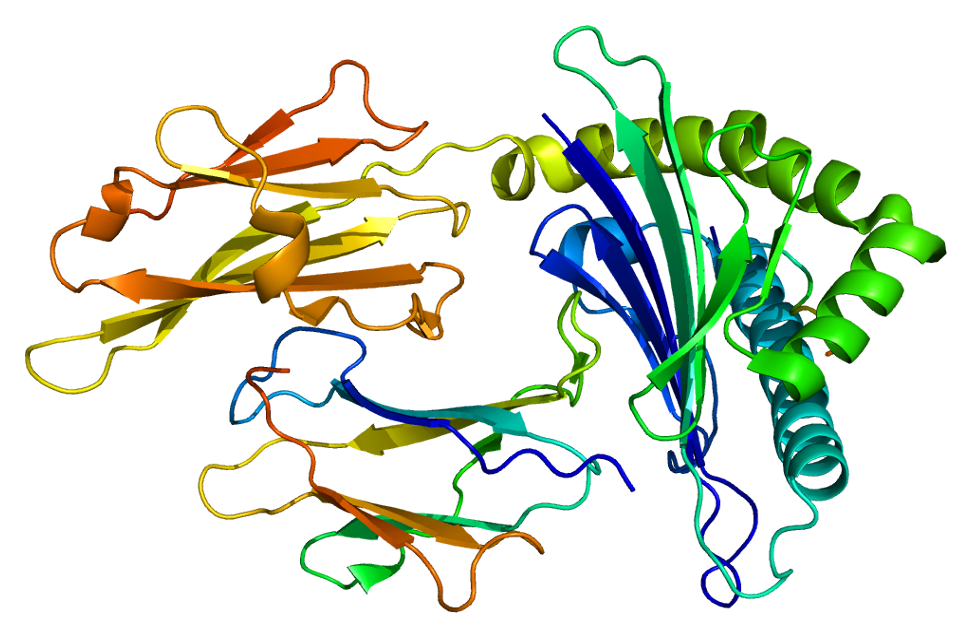

Identifiers
- Aliases: HLA-G, MHC-G, major histocompatibility complex, class I, G
- External IDs: OMIM: 142871; MGI: 95915; GeneCards: HLA-G
Available structures
PDB	Ortholog search: PDBe RCSB
PDB	List of PDB id codes 3KYO, 1YDP, 2D31, 2DYP, 3BZE, 3CDG, 3CII, 3KYN

Gene location (Human)
Chr.	Chromosome 6 (human)
Band	6p22.1	Start	29,826,967 bp
Band	6p22.1	End	29,831,125 bp

Gene location (Mouse)
Chr.	Chromosome 17 (mouse)
Band	17 B1|17 19.16 cM	Start	37,581,111 bp
Band	17 B1|17 19.16 cM	End	37,585,375 bp
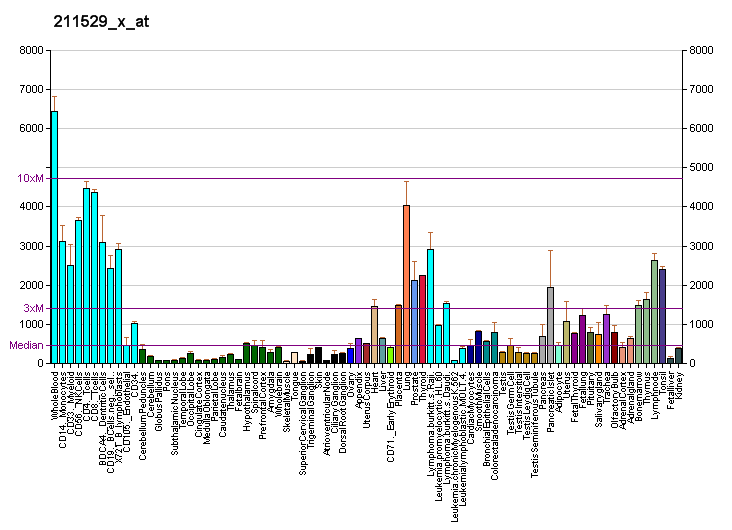

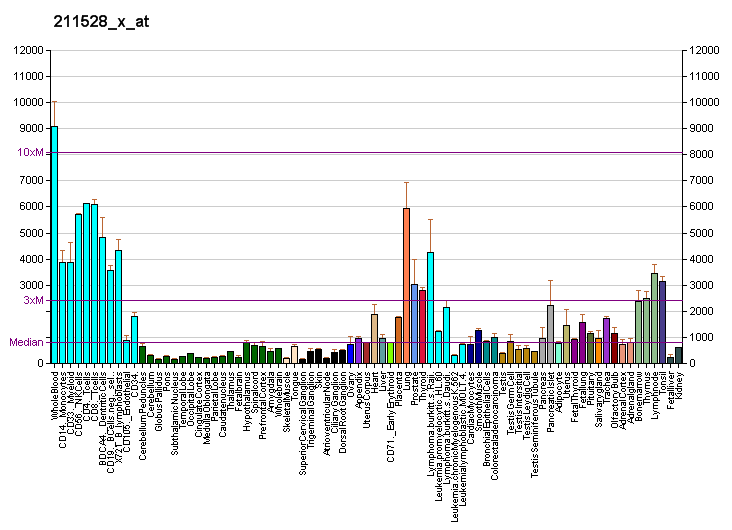

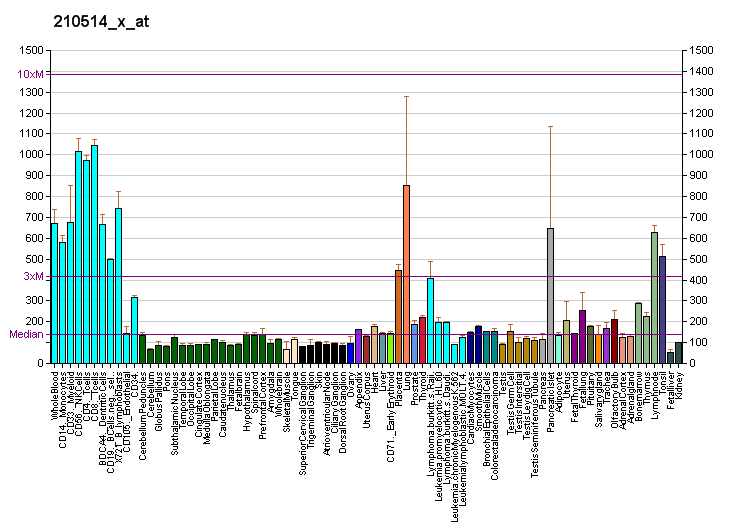
RNA expression pattern
Bgee	Human / Mouse (ortholog); Top expressed in: placenta; gonad; testicle; pituitary gland; anterior pituitary; stromal cell of endometrium; duodenum; rectum; blood; upper lobe of left lung / Top expressed in: mesenteric lymph nodes; spleen; Ileal epithelium; aortic valve; supraoptic nucleus; blood; stroma of bone marrow; carotid body; subcutaneous adipose tissue; islet of Langerhans; More reference expression data
BioGPS	More reference expression data
Gene ontology
Molecular function	protein homodimerization activity; signaling receptor binding; peptide antigen binding; protein binding; identical protein binding; CD8 receptor binding
Cellular component	integral component of membrane; phagocytic vesicle membrane; early endosome membrane; membrane; Golgi membrane; MHC class I protein complex; ER to Golgi transport vesicle membrane; integral component of lumenal side of endoplasmic reticulum membrane; recycling endosome membrane; extracellular region; plasma membrane; endosome; early endosome; endoplasmic reticulum; endoplasmic reticulum membrane; filopodium membrane; cis-Golgi network membrane; cell projection; extracellular space; external side of plasma membrane
Biological process	antigen processing and presentation of exogenous peptide antigen via MHC class I, TAP-dependent; positive regulation of tolerance induction; positive regulation of interleukin-12 production; interferon-gamma-mediated signaling pathway; immune system process; positive regulation of regulatory T cell differentiation; positive regulation of T cell tolerance induction; antigen processing and presentation of exogenous peptide antigen via MHC class I, TAP-independent; cellular defense response; negative regulation of T cell proliferation; negative regulation of immune response; type I interferon signaling pathway; regulation of immune response; immune response-inhibiting cell surface receptor signaling pathway; negative regulation of dendritic cell differentiation; antigen processing and presentation of peptide antigen via MHC class I; negative regulation of T cell mediated cytotoxicity; positive regulation of T cell mediated cytotoxicity; peripheral B cell tolerance induction; antigen processing and presentation of endogenous peptide antigen via MHC class Ib; positive regulation of natural killer cell cytokine production; immune response; negative regulation of angiogenesis; protection from natural killer cell mediated cytotoxicity; negative regulation of natural killer cell mediated cytotoxicity; negative regulation of protein kinase B signaling; positive regulation of macrophage cytokine production; protein homotrimerization; negative regulation of G0 to G1 transition; positive regulation of endothelial cell apoptotic process; positive regulation of cellular senescence; antigen processing and presentation of endogenous peptide antigen via MHC class I via ER pathway, TAP-independent
Sources:Amigo / QuickGO
Orthologs
Databases	NCBI: entry; OMA: entry
Species	Human	Mouse
Entrez	3135	14991
Ensembl	ENSG00000230413; ENSG00000233095; ENSG00000237216; ENSG00000276051; ENSG00000204632 ENSG00000235346; ENSG00000235680; ENSG00000206506	ENSMUSG00000016206
UniProt	P17693	Q31093
RefSeq (mRNA)	NM_002127; NM_001363567; NM_001384280; NM_001384290	NM_013819
RefSeq (protein)	NP_002118; NP_001350496	NP_038847
Location (UCSC)	Chr 6: 29.83 – 29.83 Mb	Chr 17: 37.58 – 37.59 Mb
PubMed search
- Wikidata
View/Edit Human	View/Edit Mouse

HLA-G histocompatibility antigen, class I, G, also known as human leukocyte antigen G (HLA-G), is a protein that in humans is encoded by the HLA-G gene.

HLA-G belongs to the HLA nonclassical class I heavy chain paralogues. Classical HLA I proteins are found on all nucleated cells and express peptides in their peptide binding groove. They can express "self" peptides when the cell is healthy as well as foreign peptides when the cell is infected by a parasite or cancer. HLA-G is a nonclassical protein and serves a different function from classical HLA class I molecules, but it still expresses a nine amino acid peptide in its peptide binding groove. The third and ninth amino acid in the peptide sequence serve as anchor residues, and are thus conserved in all the peptides HLA-G bind to.

== Structure ==
This class I molecule is a heterodimer consisting of a heavy chain and a light chain (beta-2 microglobulin). The heavy chain is anchored in the membrane. HLA-G is coded for by 88 alleles. The heavy chain is approximately 45 kDa and its gene contains 8 exons. Exon one encodes the leader peptide, exons 2 and 3 encode the alpha1 and alpha2 domain, which both bind the peptide, exon 4 encodes the alpha3 domain, exon 5 encodes the transmembrane region, and exon 6 encodes the cytoplasmic tail. Exon 7 and 8 are not translated due to a stop codon present in exon 6.

HLA-G can be expressed under at least seven isoforms through alternative splicing, called HLA-G1, HLA-G2,..., HLA-G7. The protein can be both membrane-bound and soluble. HLA-G1 through G4 are membrane bound and HLA-G5 through G7 are soluble. HLA-G1 and HLA-G5 are the most studied isoforms due to the wider availability of antibodies targeting them. HLA-G can present a more narrow variety of peptides than its classical HLA class I counterparts due to it having a more limited polymorphism.

== Function ==
HLA-G is a major immune checkpoint, meaning it downregulates the immune system's response. Soluble HLA-G can be found in the saliva, ascitic fluid, plasma, thymus, seminal plasma, cerebrospinal fluid, and in first and second term placentas. Membrane-bound HLA-G is predominantly found on trophoblast cells in the placenta, but it is also found in the thymus, cornea, erythroblasts, and mesenchymal stem cells. It can be upregulated in cancers. Peptides are connected to HLA-G by the peptide loading complex in the endoplasmic reticulum.

=== Pregnancy ===
HLA-G plays a role in immune tolerance in pregnancy, being expressed in the placenta by extravillous trophoblast cells (EVT), while the classical MHC class I genes (HLA-A and HLA-B) are not. As HLA-G was first identified in placenta samples, many studies have evaluated its role in pregnancy disorders, such as preeclampsia and recurrent pregnancy loss. Its downregulation is related to HLA-A and -B downregulation results in protection from cytotoxic T cell responses, but would in theory result in a missing self response by natural killer cells. HLA-G is a ligand for natural killer (NK) cell inhibitory receptor KIR2DL4, and therefore expression of this HLA by the trophoblast defends it against NK cell-mediated death.

The presence of soluble HLA-G (sHLA-G) in embryos is associated with better pregnancy rates. In order to optimize pregnancy rates, there is significant evidence that a morphological scoring system is the best strategy for the selection of embryos. However, presence of soluble HLA-G might be considered as a second parameter if a choice has to be made between embryos of morphologically equal quality.

=== Parasitic infections ===
HLA-G has been shown to modulate the body's response to parasitic diseases. Recent studies have emerged suggesting a link between HLA-G and Plasmodium falciparum, which is one of the most dangerous malaria species. In pregnant women, P. falciparum can infect the placenta, causing low birth weights and other complications. High levels of soluble HLA-G have been linked to higher instances of low birth weights. There is also a link between HLA-G expression and human African trypanosomiasis (HAT). People with higher levels of soluble HLA-G are more likely to be diagnosed with the disease. There may also be genetic differences driving the instance and severity of HAT, as a few single-nucleotide polymorphisms have been associated with higher levels of HAT. There is also an effect in toxoplasmosis infections in pregnant women, where HLA-G is upregulated to protect the fetus from inflammation. Treatment of cells with IL-10 leads to a downregulation of HLA-G, which could be an avenue for therapy in instances where too much HLA-G is produced. Individuals with visceral leishmaniasis infections also have higher levels of soluble HLA-G, which may be due to a strategy by Leishmania to evade the immune system.

=== Cancer ===
HLA-G has been shown to be associated with tumor escape in cancers, because it causes the immune system to not pay attention to cancer cells. Because it is upregulated in cancer cells, it could serve as a potential target for immunotherapy. Monoclonal antibodies that bind to HLA-G have been used successfully against cancers as part of a strategy to inhibit immune checkpoints. HLA-G has potential utility as a tumor marker due to the large increase in HLA-G in many cancers, including breast cancer, ovarian cancer, and lung cancer. Increased expression of HLA-G has been associated with the metastatic potential of tumor cells.

=== Allergy ===
HLA-G has links to allergenic responses in the body. Soluble HLA-G levels are higher in the serum of people with allergic rhinitis, or hay fever. Additionally, single nucleotide polymorphisms in HLA-G have been connected to an increased likelihood of having asthma. Papillary cells expressing HLA-G were found in patients with atopic dermatitis.

== Interactions ==
HLA-G has been shown to interact with CD8A. When in its soluble form, HLA-G interacts with Ig-like transcript 2 (ILT2), a leukocyte receptor. When it is membrane bound, it interacts with Ig-like transcript 4 (ILT4). Soluble HLA-G can bind to KIR2DL4, which is often found on the surface of natural killer cells. The identity of the peptide presented by HLA-G is unrelated to the binding of HLA with KIR2DL4, ILT2, or ILT4. Because HLA-G interacts with receptors using a variety of its domains, multiple antibodies are necessary to inhibit all of its functions.

Both ILT2 and ILT4 cause negative intracellular signaling. In monocytes, binding to either ILT2 or ILT4 receptors cause the inhibition of monocyte/macrophage mediated toxicity. In dendritic cells, binding to both receptors can prevent dendritic cells from maturing and prevent the activation of T cells. Additionally, HLA-G may interact with ILT4 receptors on the surface of neutrophils to inhibit phagocytosis. In natural killer cells, HLA-G binds with the ILT2 receptor to inhibit the secretion of IFN-γ, a cytokine that can activate macrophages and stimulate natural killer cells and neutrophils. HLA-G binds to ILT2 on B cells to cause the inhibition of B cell proliferation, differentiation, and the secretion of antibodies. It binds to ILT2 on T cells to downregulate T cell chemokine expression. The cytokine expression of T cells mimics that of T_{H}2 cells. HLA-G causes apoptosis in CD8+ T cells. All together these effects serve to decrease the inflammatory response of the immune system.

== HLA-G as a clinical target ==
=== Immune checkpoint inhibitors ===
Because of HLA-G's role in inhibiting NK cell responses in cancer, clinical immune checkpoint inhibitors targeting HLA-G have been designed. Tizona Therapeutics developed TTX-080, a monoclonal antibody targeting HLA-G's interaction with ILT2 and ILT4. In 2020, a phase 1a/1b trial began to assess safety and preliminary efficacy in multiple cancers. Early results showed activity in HPV-negative HNSCC and HER2-negative metastatic colorectal cancer with WT RAS/BRAF, leading to an expansion of the trial.

=== CAR T-cell therapy ===
HLA-G is both an immune checkpoint and a tumor-specific antigen, making it a target for the development of CAR T-cell therapies, which have been shown to have efficacy in in vitro mouse models. The company Invectys developed the CAR T-cell therapy IVS-3001 targeting HLA-G and began Phase1\2a clinical trials June 2023. Based on preliminary results, IVS-3001 was granted FDA fast track designation, expediting development and review of the therapy for potential use in patients with renal cell carcinoma (RCC).
