= Sperm-associated antigen 11B =

Protein-coding gene in the species Homo sapiens

SPAG11B

Identifiers
- Aliases: SPAG11B, EDDM2B, EP2, EP2C, EP2D, HE2, HE2C, SPAG11, sperm associated antigen 11B
- External IDs: OMIM: 606560; MGI: 3647173; GeneCards: SPAG11B

Gene location (Human)
| Chr. | Chromosome 8 (human) |
| Band | 8p23.1 | Start | 7,442,684 bp |
| Band | 8p23.1 | End | 7,463,674 bp |

Gene location (Mouse)
| Chr. | Chromosome 8 (mouse) |
| Band | 8|8 A1.3 | Start | 19,190,775 bp |
| Band | 8|8 A1.3 | End | 19,193,026 bp |
RNA expression pattern
| Bgee | Human / Mouse (ortholog); Top expressed in: testicle; monocyte; endometrium; left uterine tube; cervix; mucosa of esophagus; ectocervix; prefrontal cortex; blood; nucleus accumbens / Top expressed in: esophagus; zone of skin; ovary; testicle; thymus; liver; primary visual cortex; spleen; kidney; muscle tissue; More reference expression data |
| BioGPS | n/a |
Gene ontology
| Molecular function | molecular function |
| Cellular component | extracellular region |
| Biological process | spermatogenesis; antimicrobial humoral immune response mediated by antimicrobial peptide; defense response; defense response to bacterium |
Sources:Amigo / QuickGO
Orthologs
| Databases | NCBI: entry; OMA: entry |
| Species | Human | Mouse |
| Entrez | 10407 | 546038 |
| Ensembl | ENSG00000164871; ENSG00000274405; ENSG00000288309 | ENSMUSG00000059463 |
| UniProt | Q08648 | Q8K4N2; Q3UW43 |
| RefSeq (mRNA) | NM_016512; NM_058200; NM_058201; NM_058202; NM_058203 NM_058206; NM_058207 | NM_001034905; NM_001039563; NM_001286493 |
| RefSeq (protein) | NP_057596; NP_478107; NP_478108; NP_478109; NP_478110 NP_478113; NP_478114; NP_001075021; NP_001350655 | NP_694755; NP_001030077; NP_001034652; NP_001273422 |
| Location (UCSC) | Chr 8: 7.44 – 7.46 Mb | Chr 8: 19.19 – 19.19 Mb |
| PubMed search |
- Wikidata
| View/Edit Human | View/Edit Mouse |

Sperm-associated antigen 11B is a protein that in humans is encoded by the SPAG11B gene. SPAG11B lies in a region of the chromosome which see frequently duplications, and subsequently there is a near-duplicate gene called SPAG11A near its position in humans.

== Function ==
This gene encodes several androgen-dependent, epididymis-specific secretory proteins. The specific functions of these proteins have not been determined, but they are thought to be involved in sperm maturation. Some of the isoforms contain regions of similarity to beta-defensins, a family of antimicrobial peptides. The gene is located on chromosome 8p23 near the defensin gene cluster. Alternative splicing of this gene results in seven transcript variants encoding different isoforms. Two different N-terminal and five different C-terminal protein sequences are encoded by the splice variants. Two additional variants have been described, but their full length sequences have not been determined.
