= Sperm-associated antigen 6 =

Protein-coding gene in the species Homo sapiens

SPAG6

Identifiers
- Aliases: SPAG6, CT141, Repro-SA-1, pf16, sperm associated antigen 6, FAP194, CFAP194
- External IDs: OMIM: 605730; MGI: 1354388; GeneCards: SPAG6

Gene location (Human)
Chr.	Chromosome 10 (human)
Band	10p12.2	Start	22,345,445 bp
Band	10p12.2	End	22,454,224 bp
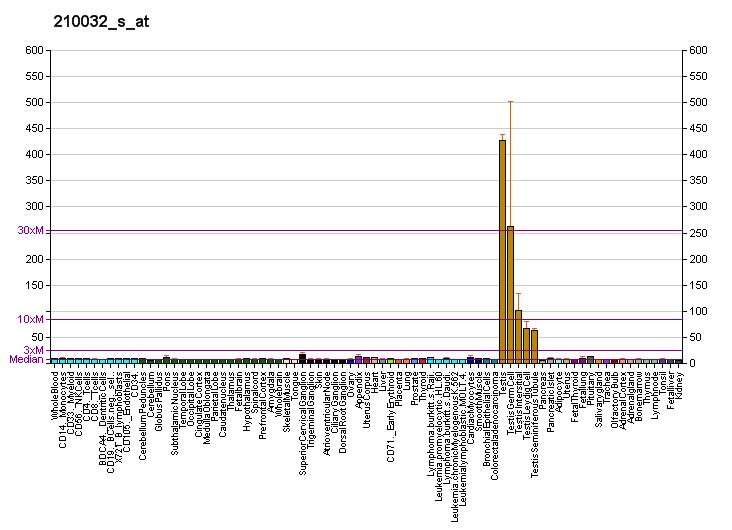

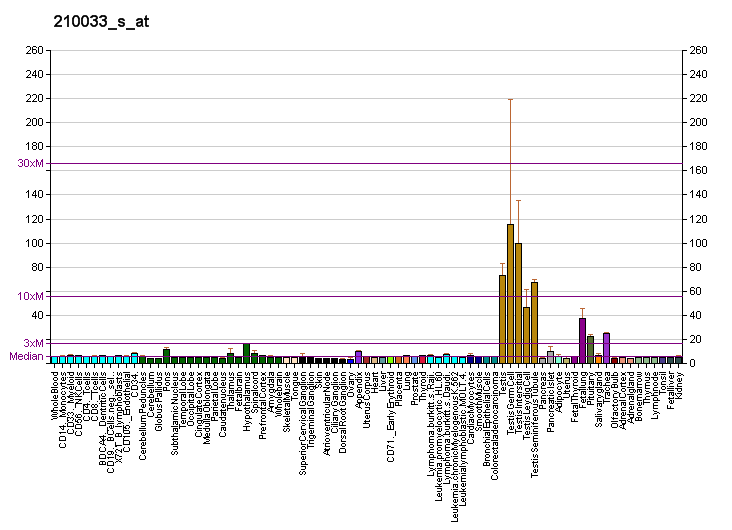
RNA expression pattern
Bgee	Human / Mouse (ortholog); Top expressed in: bronchial epithelial cell; right uterine tube; sperm; olfactory zone of nasal mucosa; Epithelium of choroid plexus; left testis; right testis; mucosa of paranasal sinus; epithelium of nasopharynx; nasal epithelium / n/a; More reference expression data
BioGPS	More reference expression data
Orthologs
Databases	NCBI: entry; OMA: entry
Species	Human	Mouse
Entrez	9576	50525
Ensembl	ENSG00000077327	ENSMUSG00000022783
UniProt	O75602	Q9JLI7
RefSeq (mRNA)	NM_001253854; NM_001253855; NM_012443; NM_172242	NM_015773
RefSeq (protein)	NP_001240783; NP_001240784; NP_036575; NP_758442	NP_056588
Location (UCSC)	Chr 10: 22.35 – 22.45 Mb	n/a
PubMed search
- Wikidata
View/Edit Human	View/Edit Mouse

Sperm-associated antigen 6 is a protein that in humans is encoded by the SPAG6 gene.

== Function ==
The correlation of anti-sperm antibodies with cases of unexplained infertility implicates a role for these antibodies in blocking fertilization. Improved diagnosis and treatment of immunologic infertility, as well as identification of proteins for targeted contraception, are dependent on the identification and characterization of relevant sperm antigens. The protein expressed by this gene is recognized by anti-sperm antibodies from an infertile man. This protein localizes to the tail of permeabilized human sperm and contains eight contiguous armadillo repeats, a motif known to mediate protein-protein interactions. Studies in mice suggest that this protein is involved in sperm flagellar motility and maintenance of the structural integrity of mature sperm. Alternatively spliced variants that encode different protein isoforms have been described but the full-length sequences of only two have been determined.
