= PROB1 =

Protein-coding gene in the species Homo sapiens

Identifiers
- Aliases: PROB1, C5orf65, proline-rich basic protein 1, proline rich basic protein 1
- External IDs: MGI: 2686460; HomoloGene: 83773; GeneCards: PROB1; OMA:PROB1 - orthologs

Gene location (Human)
Chr.	Chromosome 5 (human)
Band	5q31.2	Start	139,390,592 bp
Band	5q31.2	End	139,395,104 bp

Gene location (Mouse)
Chr.	Chromosome 18 (mouse)
Band	18|18 B2	Start	35,783,404 bp
Band	18|18 B2	End	35,788,291 bp
RNA expression pattern
Bgee	Human / Mouse (ortholog); Top expressed in: quadriceps femoris muscle; gastrocnemius muscle; muscle of thigh; skeletal muscle tissue; apex of heart; thymus; left ventricle; testicle; right auricle of heart; left adrenal gland / Top expressed in: muscle of thigh; interventricular septum; blastocyst; esophagus; right kidney; skeletal muscle tissue; yolk sac; embryo; proximal tubule; ventricular zone; More reference expression data
BioGPS	n/a
Orthologs
Species	Human	Mouse
Entrez	389333	381148
Ensembl	ENSG00000228672	ENSMUSG00000073600
UniProt	E7EW31	n/a
RefSeq (mRNA)	NM_001161546	NM_001270646
RefSeq (protein)	NP_001155018	n/a
Location (UCSC)	Chr 5: 139.39 – 139.4 Mb	Chr 18: 35.78 – 35.79 Mb
PubMed search
- Wikidata
View/Edit Human	View/Edit Mouse

Proline-rich basic protein 1 (PROB1) is a protein encoded by the PROB1 gene located on human chromosome 5, open reading frame 65. PROB1 is also known as C5orf65 and weakly similar to basic proline-rich protein.

== Gene ==
=== Characteristics ===
The PROB1 gene is 3251 bp long and contains a single exon.

=== Location ===
The PROB1 gene is located on human chromosome 5, cytogenetic band 5q31.2.

== mRNA ==
=== Expression ===
PROB1 is expressed in 89 types of tissue in the human body, with highest expression in the skeletal muscle of the leg and cardiac muscle of the heart. While mRNA expression is somewhat ubiquitous and was also elevated in the spinal cord, cerebrum, and lymphocytes, measurable protein expression was only recorded in cardiac and skeletal muscle.

== Protein ==
PROB1 is composed of 1015 amino acids. It contains two proline-rich regions, which compose the majority of the protein, and a domain of unknown function (DUF).

=== Structure ===
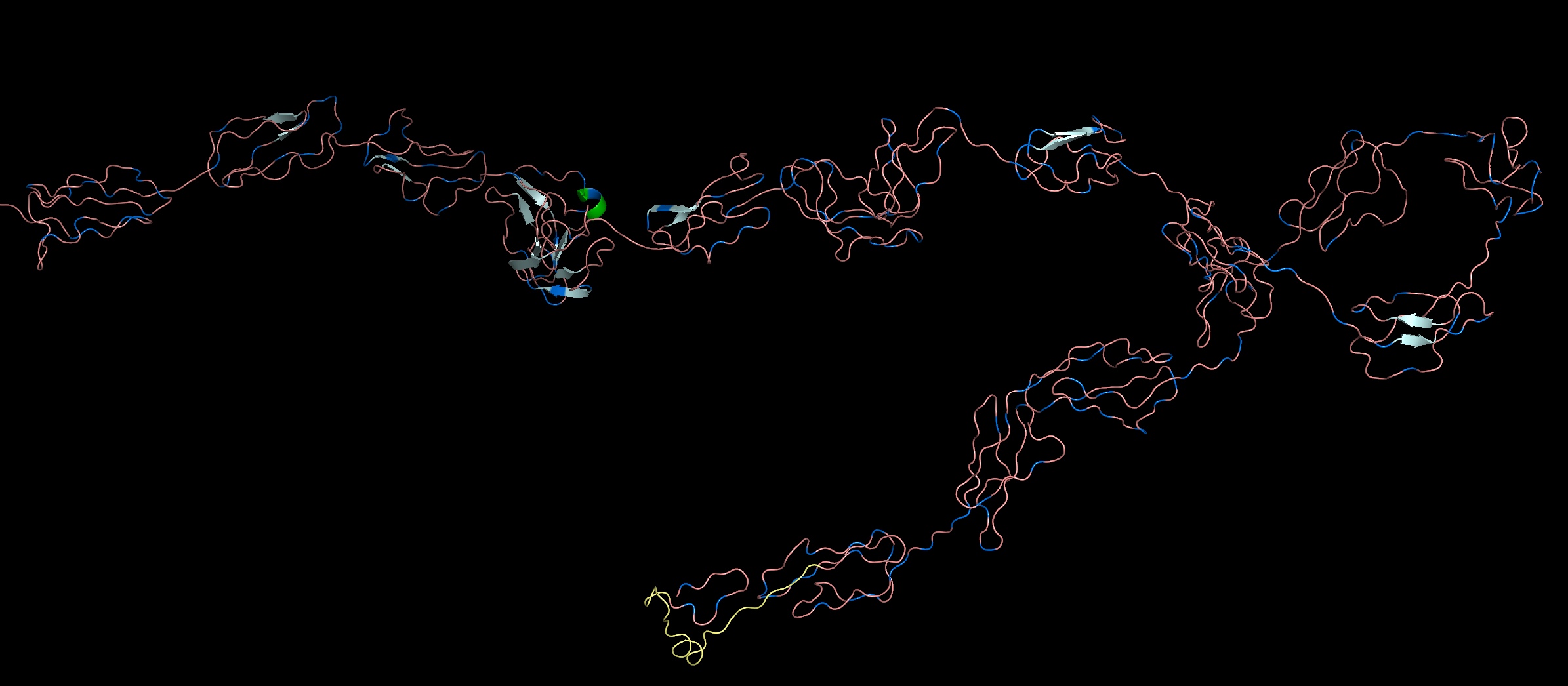
Predicted tertiary structure of PROB1 generated by I-Tasser and rendered in PyMOL. The dark blue indicates prolines and yellow marks the DUF. The alpha helices are colored green, beta sheets are colored light blue, and random coils are colored pink.

Predicted secondary structures for PROB1 reveal that the protein is mostly composed of random coils, with a small percentage of alpha helices and beta sheets present. This is likely due to the properties of proline; its large size, ring structure, and confined phi angle cause it to disrupt secondary structure formation. The DUF, which resides in the second proline-rich region of the protein, is also predicted to be completely composed of random coils. A tertiary structure prediction for PROB1 was generated using I-Tasser and rendered in PyMOL; overall, the protein displays an elongated structure.

=== Sub-cellular Localization ===
Analysis of protein structure, post-translational modifications, and localization signals reveals that PROB1 has no transmembrane domains and is an intracellular protein. Immunohistochemistry indicates its localization to the nucleoplasm of the cell.

=== Post-translational Modifications ===
An array of post-translational modifications were found for PROB1, including an S-palmitolyation site and a multitude of overlapping O-GlcNAcylation and phosphorylation sites. A representation containing a subset of the predicted modifications was generated using Dog 2.0 and is shown below.

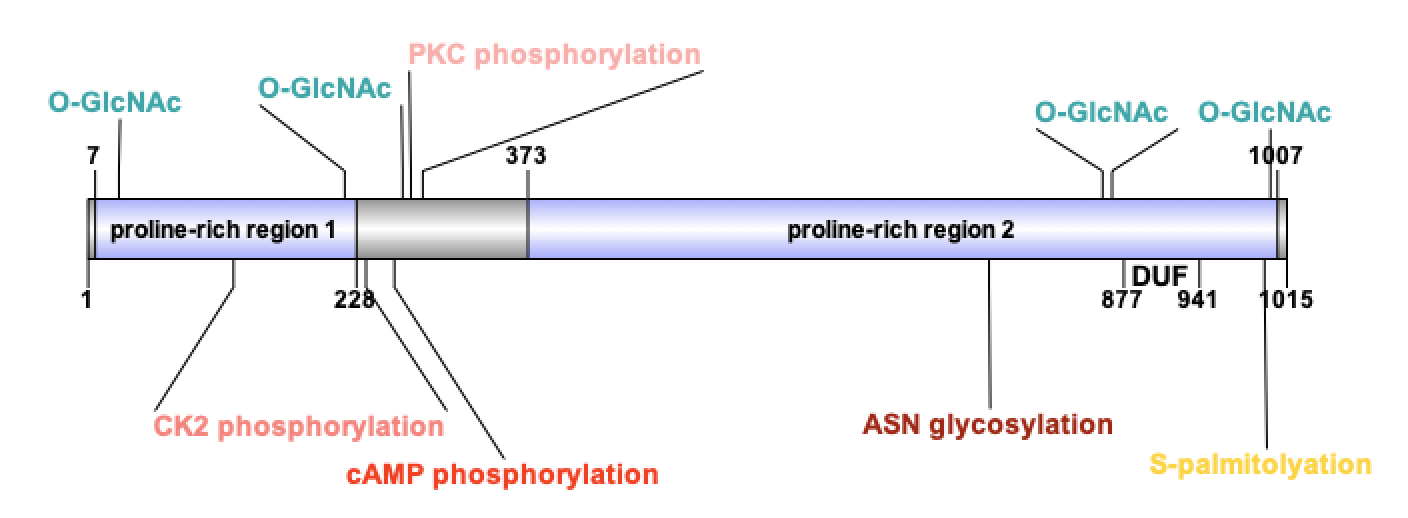
Schematic of the PROB1 protein annotated with predicted post-translational modifications, created using Dog 2.0.

=== Interactions ===
PROB1 has been found to be coexpressed with proteins SPATA24 and JADE2, but no notable functional protein interactions with PROB1 are known at this time.

== Homology ==
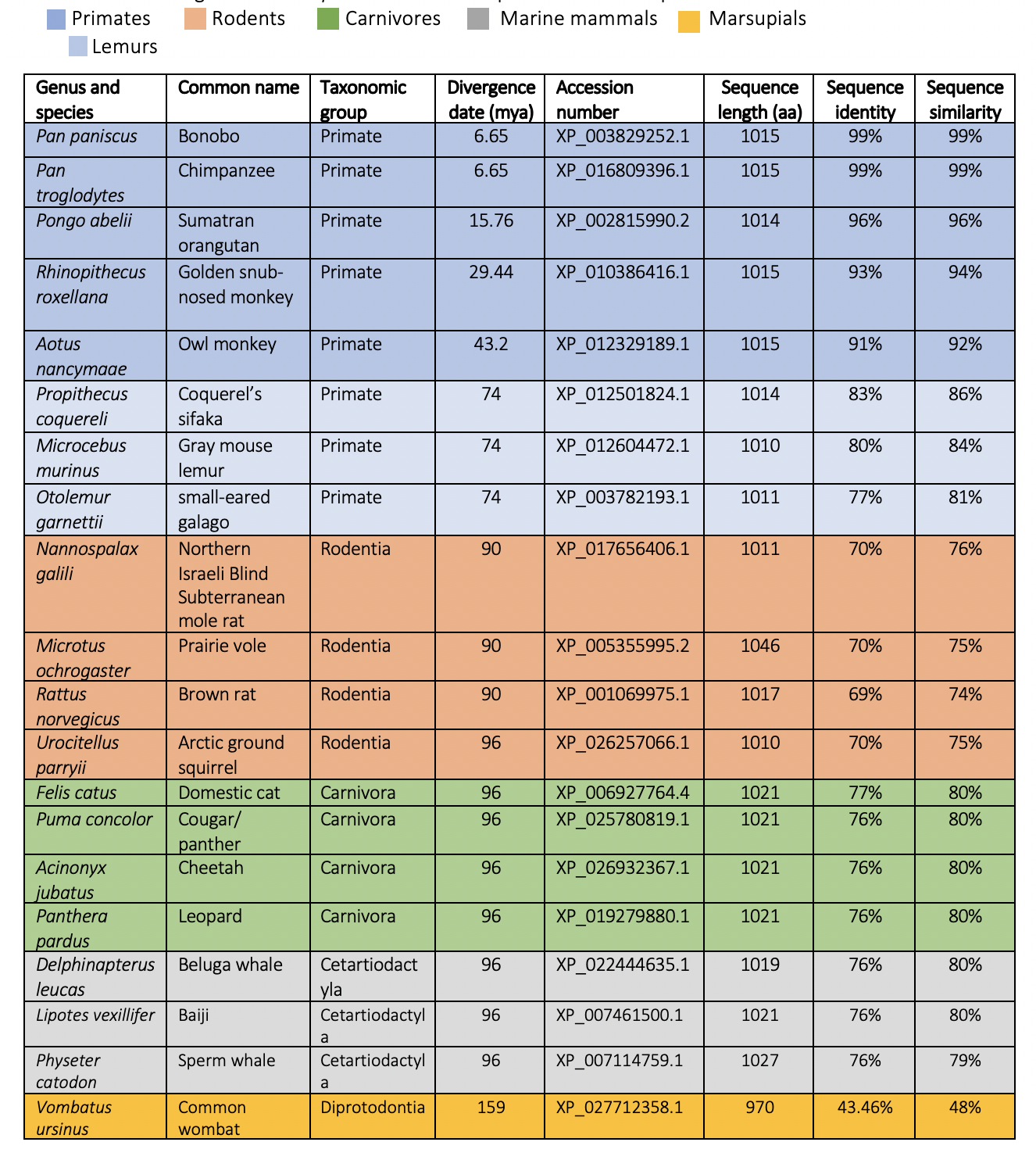
A subset of the mammalian orthologs of PROB1 predicted by BLAST.

=== Paralogs ===
There are no known human paralogs of PROB1 to date.

=== Orthologs ===
PROB1 has only mammalian orthologs. Its most distant ortholog is the marsupial Vombatus ursinus (common wombat), which is estimated to have diverged about 159 million years ago as dated by TimeTree. A subset of the multitude of orthologs produced by BLAST is shown in the accompanying table.

== Clinical Significance ==
PROB1 is implicated in keratoconus, which causes collagen-related degeneration of the cornea. Variants of PROB1 in the 5q31.1-q35.3 linkage region completely segregated with the keratoconus phenotype in a study utilizing segregation analysis methodology. Additionally, PROB1 expression is shown to be significantly elevated in several disease states, including head and neck cancer and prostate inflammation.
