= ENTPD6 =

Protein-coding gene in the species Homo sapiens

Identifiers
- Aliases: ENTPD6, CD39L2, IL-6SAG, IL6ST2, NTPDase-6, dJ738P15.3, ectonucleoside triphosphate diphosphohydrolase 6 (putative), ectonucleoside triphosphate diphosphohydrolase 6
- External IDs: OMIM: 603160; MGI: 1202295; GeneCards: ENTPD6
Enzyme activity
EC #	BRENDA	ExPASy	KEGG	MetaCyc
3.6.1.6	↗	↗	↗	↗

Gene location (Human)
Chr.	Chromosome 20 (human)
Band	20p11.21	Start	25,195,693 bp
Band	20p11.21	End	25,228,075 bp

Gene location (Mouse)
Chr.	Chromosome 2 (mouse)
Band	2|2 G3	Start	150,749,042 bp
Band	2|2 G3	End	150,771,675 bp
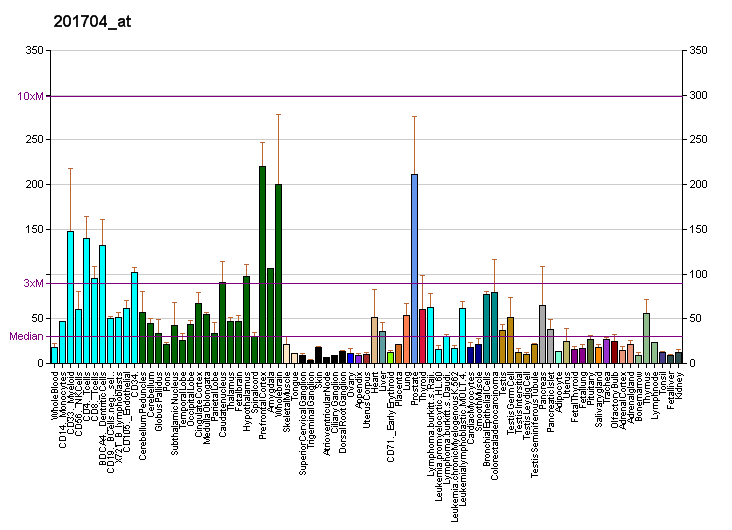
RNA expression pattern
Bgee	Human / Mouse (ortholog); Top expressed in: apex of heart; right hemisphere of cerebellum; right frontal lobe; right auricle of heart; nucleus accumbens; mucosa of transverse colon; middle frontal gyrus; anterior pituitary; caudate nucleus; prefrontal cortex / Top expressed in: spermatocyte; spermatid; seminiferous tubule; dorsomedial hypothalamic nucleus; subiculum; paraventricular nucleus of hypothalamus; ventromedial nucleus; anterior amygdaloid area; dentate gyrus of hippocampal formation granule cell; lateral hypothalamus; More reference expression data
BioGPS	More reference expression data
Gene ontology
Molecular function	nucleoside-triphosphatase activity; guanosine-5'-triphosphate,3'-diphosphate diphosphatase activity; uridine-diphosphatase activity; hydrolase activity; nucleoside-diphosphatase activity
Cellular component	integral component of membrane; cell surface; Golgi membrane; plasma membrane; membrane; extracellular region; extracellular space; Golgi apparatus
Biological process	response to calcium ion; response to magnesium ion; nucleobase-containing small molecule catabolic process; metabolism
Sources:Amigo / QuickGO
Orthologs
Databases	NCBI: entry; OMA: entry
Species	Human	Mouse
Entrez	955	12497
Ensembl	ENSG00000197586	ENSMUSG00000033068
UniProt	O75354; Q5QPI7	Q3U0P5
RefSeq (mRNA)	NM_001114089; NM_001247; NM_001317941; NM_001322378; NM_001322379 NM_001322380; NM_001322381; NM_001322382; NM_001322383; NM_001322384; NM_001322385; NM_001322386; NM_001322387; NM_001322388; NM_001322389; NM_001322390; NM_001322391; NM_001322392; NM_001322393; NM_001322394; NM_001322395; NM_001322396; NM_001322397; NM_001322398	NM_172117; NM_001355068
RefSeq (protein)	NP_001107561; NP_001238; NP_001304870; NP_001309307; NP_001309308 NP_001309309; NP_001309310; NP_001309311; NP_001309312; NP_001309313; NP_001309314; NP_001309315; NP_001309316; NP_001309317; NP_001309318; NP_001309319; NP_001309320; NP_001309321; NP_001309322; NP_001309323; NP_001309324; NP_001309325; NP_001309326; NP_001309327	NP_742115; NP_001341997; NP_001357558; NP_001357559; NP_001357560
Location (UCSC)	Chr 20: 25.2 – 25.23 Mb	Chr 2: 150.75 – 150.77 Mb
PubMed search
- Wikidata
View/Edit Human	View/Edit Mouse

Ectonucleoside triphosphate diphosphohydrolase 6 is an enzyme that in humans is encoded by the ENTPD6 gene.

== Function ==
ENTPD6 is similar to E-type nucleotidases (NTPases). NTPases, such as CD39, mediate catabolism of extracellular nucleotides. ENTPD6 contains 4 apyrase-conserved regions, which is characteristic of NTPases.
