= LZTS3 =

Protein-coding gene in the species Homo sapiens

Identifiers
- Aliases: LZTS3, PROSAPIP1, leucine zipper, putative tumor suppressor family member 3, leucine zipper tumor suppressor family member 3
- External IDs: OMIM: 610484; MGI: 2656976; HomoloGene: 8824; GeneCards: LZTS3; OMA:LZTS3 - orthologs

Gene location (Human)
Chr.	Chromosome 20 (human)
Band	20p13	Start	3,162,617 bp
Band	20p13	End	3,173,549 bp

Gene location (Mouse)
Chr.	Chromosome 2 (mouse)
Band	2|2 F1	Start	130,474,759 bp
Band	2|2 F1	End	130,484,723 bp
RNA expression pattern
Bgee	Human / Mouse (ortholog); Top expressed in: Brodmann area 10; cerebellar vermis; paraflocculus of cerebellum; middle frontal gyrus; Region I of hippocampus proper; postcentral gyrus; right hemisphere of cerebellum; entorhinal cortex; superior frontal gyrus; Brodmann area 46 / Top expressed in: olfactory tubercle; nucleus accumbens; primary motor cortex; superior frontal gyrus; cingulate gyrus; prefrontal cortex; globus pallidus; subiculum; primary visual cortex; dentate gyrus; More reference expression data
BioGPS	n/a
Orthologs
Species	Human	Mouse
Entrez	9762	241638
Ensembl	ENSG00000088899	ENSMUSG00000037703
UniProt	O60299	A2AHG0
RefSeq (mRNA)	NM_001282533; NM_014731; NM_001365618; NM_001367609; NM_001388189 NM_001388190; NM_001388191; NM_001388192; NM_001388193	NM_001291027; NM_001291028; NM_197945
RefSeq (protein)	NP_001269462; NP_001352547; NP_001354538	NP_001277956; NP_001277957; NP_922936
Location (UCSC)	Chr 20: 3.16 – 3.17 Mb	Chr 2: 130.47 – 130.48 Mb
PubMed search
- Wikidata
View/Edit Human	View/Edit Mouse

Leucine zipper, putative tumor suppressor family member 3 is a protein in humans that is encoded by the LZTS3 gene.
