= SPEF1 =

Protein-coding gene in the species Homo sapiens

Available structures
PDB	Ortholog search: PDBe RCSB
PDB	List of PDB id codes 2EE7

Identifiers
- Aliases: SPEF1, C20orf28, CLAMP, SPEF1A, sperm flagellar 1
- External IDs: OMIM: 610674; MGI: 3513546; HomoloGene: 15741; GeneCards: SPEF1; OMA:SPEF1 - orthologs

Gene location (Human)
Chr.	Chromosome 20 (human)
Band	20p13	Start	3,777,504 bp
Band	20p13	End	3,781,448 bp

Gene location (Mouse)
Chr.	Chromosome 2 (mouse)
Band	2 F1|2	Start	131,012,181 bp
Band	2 F1|2	End	131,029,202 bp
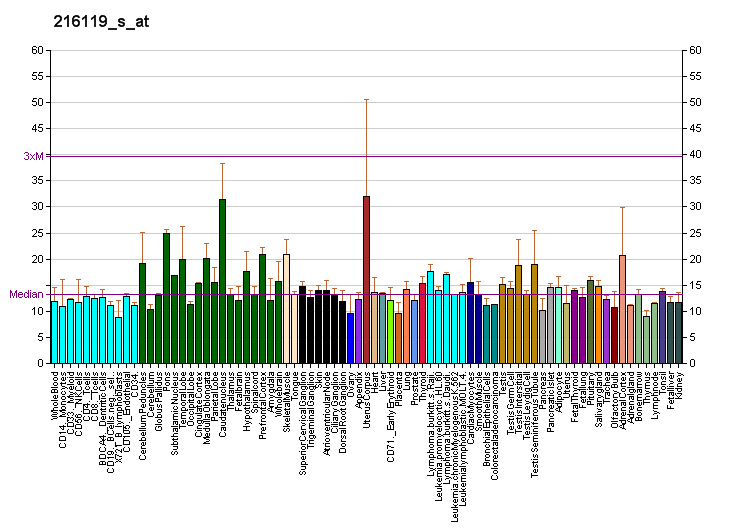
RNA expression pattern
Bgee	Human / Mouse (ortholog); Top expressed in: right uterine tube; olfactory zone of nasal mucosa; caudate nucleus; putamen; nucleus accumbens; epithelium of bronchus; bronchial epithelial cell; gonad; dorsal motor nucleus of vagus nerve; prefrontal cortex / Top expressed in: Ileal epithelium; olfactory epithelium; choroid plexus of fourth ventricle; ventricular zone; spermatocyte; spermatid; ganglionic eminence; saccule; Epithelium of choroid plexus; right lung lobe; More reference expression data
BioGPS	More reference expression data
Gene ontology
Molecular function	protein binding; microtubule binding; molecular function
Cellular component	cytoplasm; axoneme; cell projection; motile cilium; cilium; cytoskeleton; cellular component
Biological process	negative regulation of microtubule depolymerization; cell migration; biological process; cilium-dependent cell motility; regulation of cytoskeleton organization
Sources:Amigo / QuickGO
Orthologs
Species	Human	Mouse
Entrez	25876	70997
Ensembl	ENSG00000101222	ENSMUSG00000027329
UniProt	Q9Y4P9	Q99JL1
RefSeq (mRNA)	NM_015417	NM_027641
RefSeq (protein)	NP_056232	NP_081917
Location (UCSC)	Chr 20: 3.78 – 3.78 Mb	Chr 2: 131.01 – 131.03 Mb
PubMed search
- Wikidata
View/Edit Human	View/Edit Mouse

Sperm flagellar protein 1 is a protein that in humans is encoded by the SPEF1 gene.
