= PKIG =

Protein-coding gene in the species Homo sapiens

Identifiers
- Aliases: PKIG, PKI-gamma, protein kinase (cAMP-dependent, catalytic) inhibitor gamma, cAMP-dependent protein kinase inhibitor gamma
- External IDs: OMIM: 604932; MGI: 1343086; HomoloGene: 5133; GeneCards: PKIG; OMA:PKIG - orthologs

Gene location (Human)
Chr.	Chromosome 20 (human)
Band	20q13.12	Start	44,531,785 bp
Band	20q13.12	End	44,624,247 bp

Gene location (Mouse)
Chr.	Chromosome 2 (mouse)
Band	2 H3|2 84.4 cM	Start	163,500,306 bp
Band	2 H3|2 84.4 cM	End	163,568,078 bp
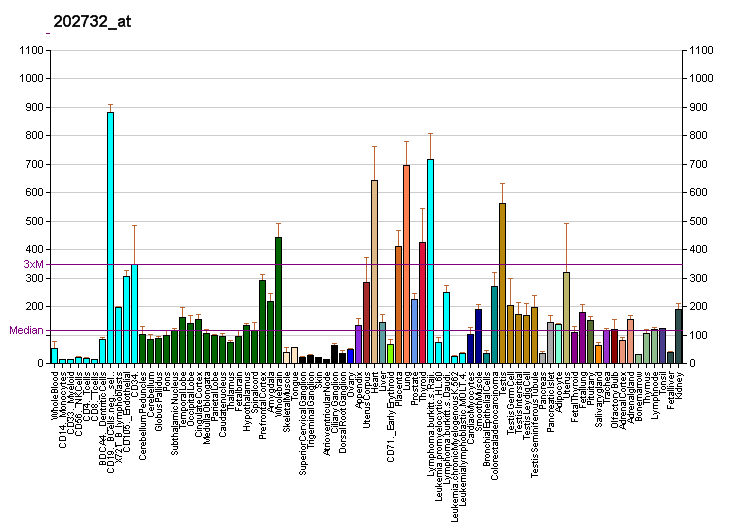
RNA expression pattern
Bgee	Human / Mouse (ortholog); Top expressed in: right coronary artery; right ventricle; apex of heart; left coronary artery; right auricle of heart; left ventricle; myocardium; vena cava; gastric mucosa; cardiac muscle tissue of right atrium / Top expressed in: otic placode; saccule; aortic valve; endocardial cushion; atrioventricular valve; ascending aorta; renal corpuscle; otic vesicle; Paneth cell; right ventricle; More reference expression data
BioGPS	More reference expression data
Gene ontology
Molecular function	protein kinase inhibitor activity; cAMP-dependent protein kinase inhibitor activity
Cellular component	cytoplasm; nucleus
Biological process	negative regulation of transcription by RNA polymerase II; negative regulation of cAMP-dependent protein kinase activity; signal transduction; negative regulation of protein kinase activity; negative regulation of protein import into nucleus
Sources:Amigo / QuickGO
Orthologs
Species	Human	Mouse
Entrez	11142	18769
Ensembl	ENSG00000168734	ENSMUSG00000035268
UniProt	Q9Y2B9	O70139
RefSeq (mRNA)	NM_181805; NM_001281444; NM_001281445; NM_007066; NM_181804	NM_001039390; NM_001039391; NM_001164053; NM_001164055; NM_001277096 NM_011106
RefSeq (protein)	NP_001268373; NP_001268374; NP_008997; NP_861520; NP_861521	NP_001034479; NP_001034480; NP_001157525; NP_001157527; NP_001264025 NP_035236
Location (UCSC)	Chr 20: 44.53 – 44.62 Mb	Chr 2: 163.5 – 163.57 Mb
PubMed search
- Wikidata
View/Edit Human	View/Edit Mouse

cAMP-dependent protein kinase inhibitor gamma is a protein that in humans is encoded by the PKIG gene.

The protein encoded by this gene is a member of the cAMP-dependent protein kinase (PKA) inhibitor family. Studies of a similar protein in mice suggest that this protein acts as a potent competitive PKA inhibitor, and is a predominant form of PKA inhibitors in various tissues. Three alternatively spliced transcript variants encoding the same protein have been reported.
