= GMEB2 =

Protein-coding gene in the species Homo sapiens

Identifiers
- Aliases: GMEB2, P79PIF, PIF79, GMEB-2, glucocorticoid modulatory element binding protein 2
- External IDs: OMIM: 607451; MGI: 2652836; GeneCards: GMEB2

Gene location (Human)
Chr.	Chromosome 20 (human)
Band	20q13.33	Start	63,587,602 bp
Band	20q13.33	End	63,627,101 bp

Gene location (Mouse)
Chr.	Chromosome 2 (mouse)
Band	2|2 H4	Start	180,893,242 bp
Band	2|2 H4	End	180,929,828 bp
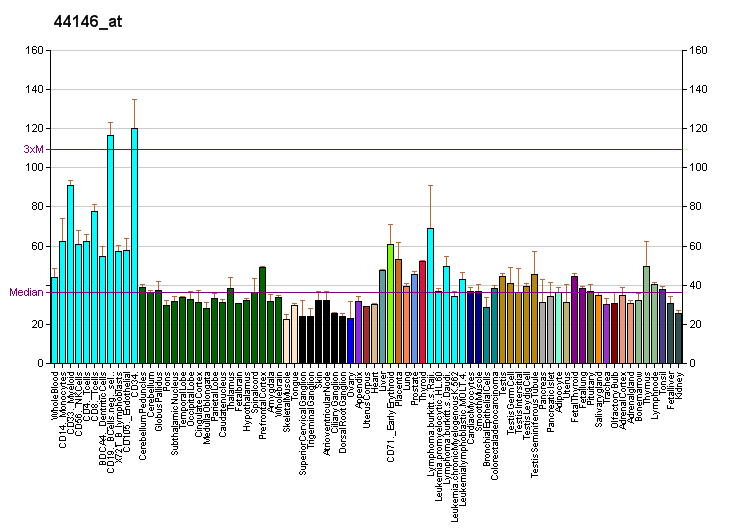

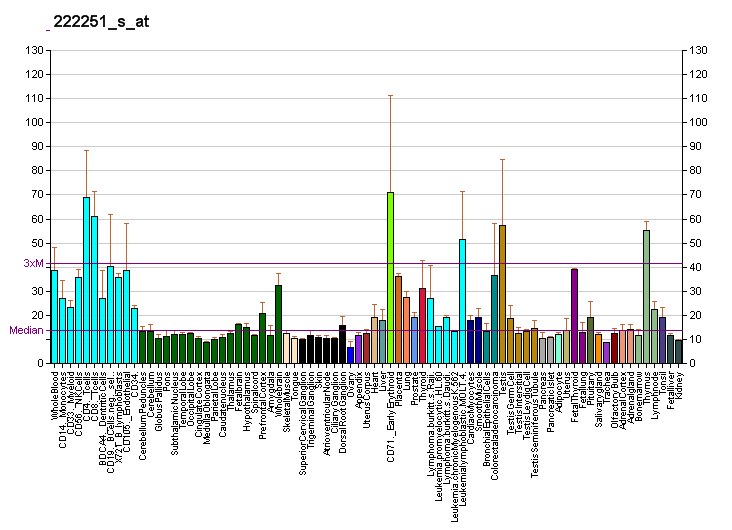
RNA expression pattern
Bgee	Human / Mouse (ortholog); Top expressed in: parotid gland; buccal mucosa cell; thymus; mucosa of urinary bladder; mucosa of ileum; pancreatic ductal cell; granulocyte; right lobe of thyroid gland; tibialis anterior muscle; blood / Top expressed in: granulocyte; hand; otolith organ; utricle; cumulus cell; blood; medial ganglionic eminence; neural layer of retina; thymus; bone marrow; More reference expression data
BioGPS	More reference expression data
Gene ontology
Molecular function	RNA polymerase II cis-regulatory region sequence-specific DNA binding; DNA binding; transcription coactivator activity; metal ion binding; protein binding; DNA-binding transcription factor activity, RNA polymerase II-specific
Cellular component	nucleus; nucleoplasm; cytoplasm; cytosol
Biological process	regulation of transcription by RNA polymerase II; regulation of transcription, DNA-templated; transcription by RNA polymerase II; transcription, DNA-templated; positive regulation of nucleic acid-templated transcription
Sources:Amigo / QuickGO
Orthologs
Databases	NCBI: entry; OMA: entry
Species	Human	Mouse
Entrez	26205	229004
Ensembl	ENSG00000101216	ENSMUSG00000038705
UniProt	Q9UKD1	P58929
RefSeq (mRNA)	NM_012384	NM_198169
RefSeq (protein)	NP_036516	NP_937812
Location (UCSC)	Chr 20: 63.59 – 63.63 Mb	Chr 2: 180.89 – 180.93 Mb
PubMed search
- Wikidata
View/Edit Human	View/Edit Mouse

Glucocorticoid modulatory element-binding protein 2 is a protein that in humans is encoded by the GMEB2 gene.

This gene is a member of KDWK gene family. The product of this gene associates with GMEB1 protein, and the complex is essential for parvovirus DNA replication. Study of rat homolog implicates the role of this gene in modulation of transactivation by the glucocorticoid receptor bound to glucocorticoid response elements. This gene appears to use multiple polyadenylation sites.
