= NRSN2 =

Protein-coding gene in the species Homo sapiens

Identifiers
- Aliases: NRSN2, C20orf98, dJ1103G7.6, neurensin 2
- External IDs: OMIM: 610666; MGI: 2684969; HomoloGene: 11802; GeneCards: NRSN2; OMA:NRSN2 - orthologs

Gene location (Human)
Chr.	Chromosome 20 (human)
Band	20p13	Start	346,782 bp
Band	20p13	End	359,660 bp

Gene location (Mouse)
Chr.	Chromosome 2 (mouse)
Band	2|2 G3	Start	152,210,675 bp
Band	2|2 G3	End	152,218,558 bp
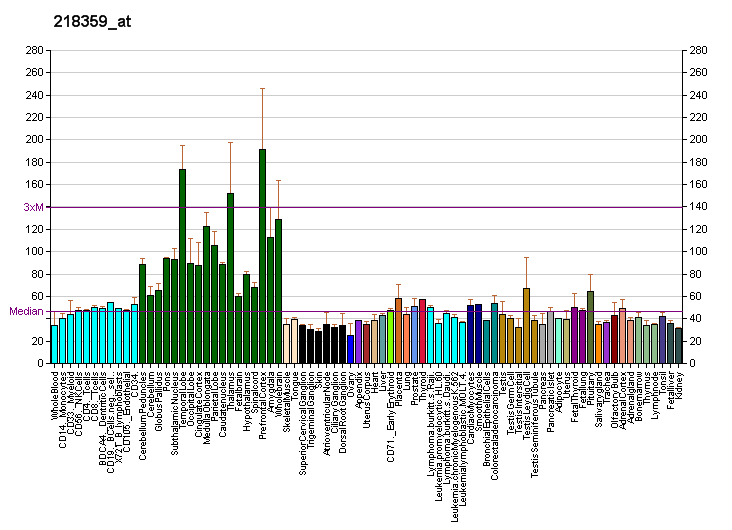
RNA expression pattern
Bgee	Human / Mouse (ortholog); Top expressed in: right frontal lobe; anterior cingulate cortex; prefrontal cortex; right hemisphere of cerebellum; dorsolateral prefrontal cortex; Brodmann area 9; anterior pituitary; caudate nucleus; left adrenal cortex; right adrenal gland / Top expressed in: superior frontal gyrus; dorsomedial hypothalamic nucleus; primary visual cortex; central gray substance of midbrain; nucleus accumbens; lumbar subsegment of spinal cord; suprachiasmatic nucleus; median eminence; ventromedial nucleus; nucleus of stria terminalis; More reference expression data
BioGPS	More reference expression data
Gene ontology
Molecular function	molecular function
Cellular component	integral component of membrane; soma; plasma membrane; transport vesicle; membrane; cytoplasmic vesicle; neuron projection
Biological process	biological process; nervous system development
Sources:Amigo / QuickGO
Orthologs
Species	Human	Mouse
Entrez	80023	228777
Ensembl	ENSG00000125841	ENSMUSG00000059361
UniProt	Q9GZP1	Q5HZK2
RefSeq (mRNA)	NM_024958; NM_001323679; NM_001323680; NM_001323681; NM_001323682 NM_001323683; NM_001323684; NM_001323685	NM_001009948; NM_001370749; NM_001370750
RefSeq (protein)	NP_001310608; NP_001310609; NP_001310610; NP_001310611; NP_001310612 NP_001310613; NP_001310614; NP_079234	NP_001009948; NP_001357678; NP_001357679
Location (UCSC)	Chr 20: 0.35 – 0.36 Mb	Chr 2: 152.21 – 152.22 Mb
PubMed search
- Wikidata
View/Edit Human	View/Edit Mouse

Neurensin-2 is a protein that in humans is encoded by the NRSN2 gene.
