= DEFB119 =

Protein-coding gene in humans

Identifiers
- Aliases: DEFB119, DEFB-19, DEFB-20, DEFB120, ESC42-RELA, ESC42-RELB, DEFB20, defensin beta 119
- External IDs: OMIM: 615997; MGI: 2385955; GeneCards: DEFB119

Gene location (Human)
Chr.	Chromosome 20 (human)
Band	20q11.21	Start	31,377,164 bp
Band	20q11.21	End	31,390,590 bp

Gene location (Mouse)
Chr.	Chromosome 2 (mouse)
Band	2|2 H1	Start	152,418,006 bp
Band	2|2 H1	End	152,422,232 bp
RNA expression pattern
Bgee	Human / Mouse (ortholog); Top expressed in: corpus epididymis; right testis; left testis; testicle; tail of epididymis; buccal mucosa cell; caput epididymis; sperm; right coronary artery; retinal pigment epithelium / Top expressed in: Gonadal ridge; seminiferous tubule; spermatocyte; embryo; spermatid; cumulus cell; efferent ductule; epithelium of seminiferous tubule of testis; Sertoli cell; morula; More reference expression data
BioGPS	n/a
Gene ontology
Molecular function	lipopolysaccharide binding
Cellular component	extracellular region; cell surface
Biological process	defense response to bacterium; defense response; innate immune response
Sources:Amigo / QuickGO
Orthologs
Databases	NCBI: entry; OMA: entry
Species	Human	Mouse
Entrez	245932	246700
Ensembl	ENSG00000180483	ENSMUSG00000050645
UniProt	Q8N690	Q8K3I8
RefSeq (mRNA)	NM_001271209; NM_153289; NM_153323	NM_145157
RefSeq (protein)	NP_001258138; NP_695021; NP_697018	NP_660139
Location (UCSC)	Chr 20: 31.38 – 31.39 Mb	Chr 2: 152.42 – 152.42 Mb
PubMed search
- Wikidata
View/Edit Human	View/Edit Mouse

Beta-defensin 119 is a protein that in humans is encoded by the DEFB119 gene.
