= PLAGL2 =

Protein-coding gene in the species Homo sapiens

Identifiers
- Aliases: PLAGL2, ZNF900, PLAG1 like zinc finger 2
- External IDs: OMIM: 604866; MGI: 1933165; GeneCards: PLAGL2

Gene location (Human)
| Chr. | Chromosome 20 (human) |
| Band | 20q11.21 | Start | 32,192,504 bp |
| Band | 20q11.21 | End | 32,207,743 bp |

Gene location (Mouse)
| Chr. | Chromosome 2 (mouse) |
| Band | 2|2 H1 | Start | 153,069,679 bp |
| Band | 2|2 H1 | End | 153,083,346 bp |
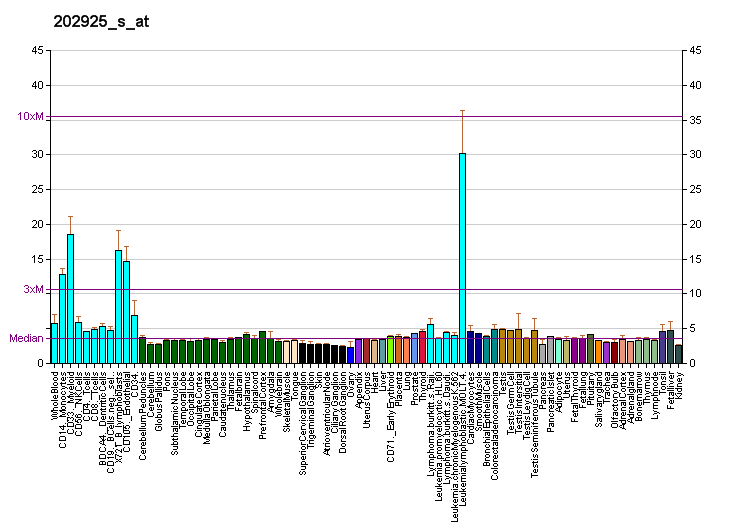

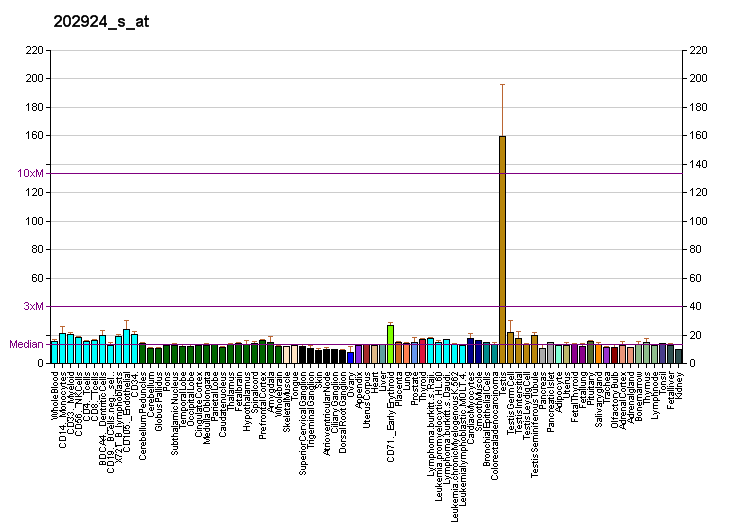
RNA expression pattern
| Bgee | Human / Mouse (ortholog); Top expressed in: sperm; monocyte; secondary oocyte; granulocyte; testicle; gonad; amniotic fluid; buccal mucosa cell; right testis; left testis / Top expressed in: epithelium of small intestine; tail of embryo; genital tubercle; fetal liver hematopoietic progenitor cell; migratory enteric neural crest cell; lens; maxillary prominence; mandibular prominence; ileum; inner renal medulla; More reference expression data |
| BioGPS | More reference expression data |
Gene ontology
| Molecular function | metal ion binding; DNA binding; nucleic acid binding; DNA-binding transcription activator activity, RNA polymerase II-specific; sequence-specific DNA binding; DNA-binding transcription factor activity; DNA-binding transcription factor activity, RNA polymerase II-specific |
| Cellular component | nucleus |
| Biological process | regulation of transcription, DNA-templated; chylomicron assembly; positive regulation of transcription by RNA polymerase II; transcription, DNA-templated; lipid metabolism; positive regulation of intrinsic apoptotic signaling pathway; post-embryonic development; transcription by RNA polymerase II; apoptotic process |
Sources:Amigo / QuickGO
Orthologs
| Databases | NCBI: entry; OMA: entry |
| Species | Human | Mouse |
| Entrez | 5326 | 54711 |
| Ensembl | ENSG00000126003 | ENSMUSG00000051413 |
| UniProt | Q9UPG8 | Q925T4 |
| RefSeq (mRNA) | NM_002657 | NM_018807 |
| RefSeq (protein) | NP_002648 | NP_061277 |
| Location (UCSC) | Chr 20: 32.19 – 32.21 Mb | Chr 2: 153.07 – 153.08 Mb |
| PubMed search |
- Wikidata
| View/Edit Human | View/Edit Mouse |

Zinc finger protein PLAGL2 is a protein that in humans is encoded by the PLAGL2 gene.

Zinc finger protein PLAGL2 is a zinc finger protein that recognizes DNA and/or RNA.

The gene has seen in gliomas to suppress cellular differentiation and thus encourage cells to become more stem cell like. Such plasticity is seen in glioma cells, together with the ignorance to differentiation factors.
