= ZNF133 =

Protein-coding gene in the species Homo sapiens

Identifiers
- Aliases: ZNF133, ZNF150, pHZ-13, pHZ-66, zinc finger protein 133
- External IDs: OMIM: 604075; GeneCards: ZNF133

Gene location (Human)
Chr.	Chromosome 20 (human)
Band	20p11.23	Start	18,288,283 bp
Band	20p11.23	End	18,316,996 bp
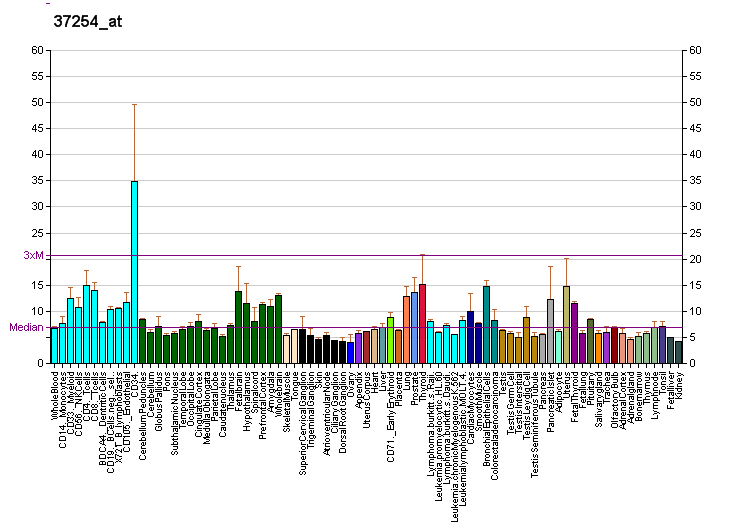

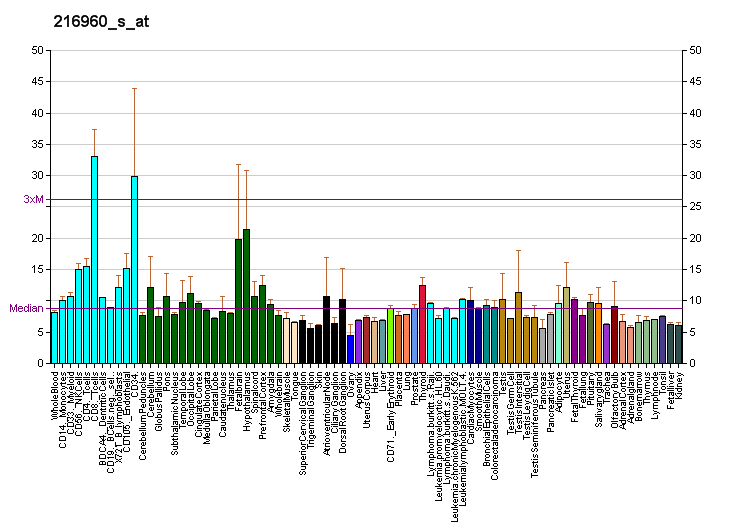
RNA expression pattern
Bgee	Human / Mouse (ortholog); Top expressed in: cerebellar hemisphere; right hemisphere of cerebellum; parotid gland; anterior pituitary; pancreatic ductal cell; apex of heart; right lobe of thyroid gland; left lobe of thyroid gland; right frontal lobe; ganglionic eminence / n/a; More reference expression data
BioGPS	More reference expression data
Gene ontology
Molecular function	DNA-binding transcription factor activity; DNA binding; protein binding; metal ion binding; nucleic acid binding; DNA-binding transcription factor activity, RNA polymerase II-specific
Cellular component	intracellular anatomical structure; nucleus
Biological process	regulation of transcription, DNA-templated; transcription, DNA-templated; regulation of transcription by RNA polymerase II
Sources:Amigo / QuickGO
Orthologs
Databases	NCBI: entry; OMA: entry
Species	Human	Mouse
Entrez	7692	n/a
Ensembl	ENSG00000125846	n/a
UniProt	P52736; Q5JXW1	n/a
RefSeq (mRNA)	NM_001083330; NM_001282995; NM_001282996; NM_001282997; NM_001282998 NM_001282999; NM_001283000; NM_001283001; NM_001283002; NM_001283003; NM_001283004; NM_001283005; NM_001283006; NM_001283007; NM_001283008; NM_003434; NM_001352450; NM_001352451; NM_001352452; NM_001352453; NM_001352454; NM_001352455; NM_001352456; NM_001352457; NM_001352458; NM_001352459; NM_001352460; NM_001352461; NM_001352462; NM_001352463; NM_001352464	n/a
RefSeq (protein)	NP_001076799; NP_001269924; NP_001269925; NP_001269926; NP_001269927 NP_001269928; NP_001269929; NP_001269930; NP_001269931; NP_001269932; NP_001269933; NP_001269934; NP_001269935; NP_001269936; NP_001269937; NP_003425; NP_001339379; NP_001339380; NP_001339381; NP_001339382; NP_001339383; NP_001339384; NP_001339385; NP_001339386; NP_001339387; NP_001339388; NP_001339389; NP_001339390; NP_001339391; NP_001339392; NP_001339393	n/a
Location (UCSC)	Chr 20: 18.29 – 18.32 Mb	n/a
PubMed search		n/a
- Wikidata
View/Edit Human

Zinc finger protein 133 is a protein that in humans is encoded by the ZNF133 gene.
