= Chromosome 20 =

Human chromosome

- Human chromosome 20 pair after G-banding. One is from mother, one is from father.

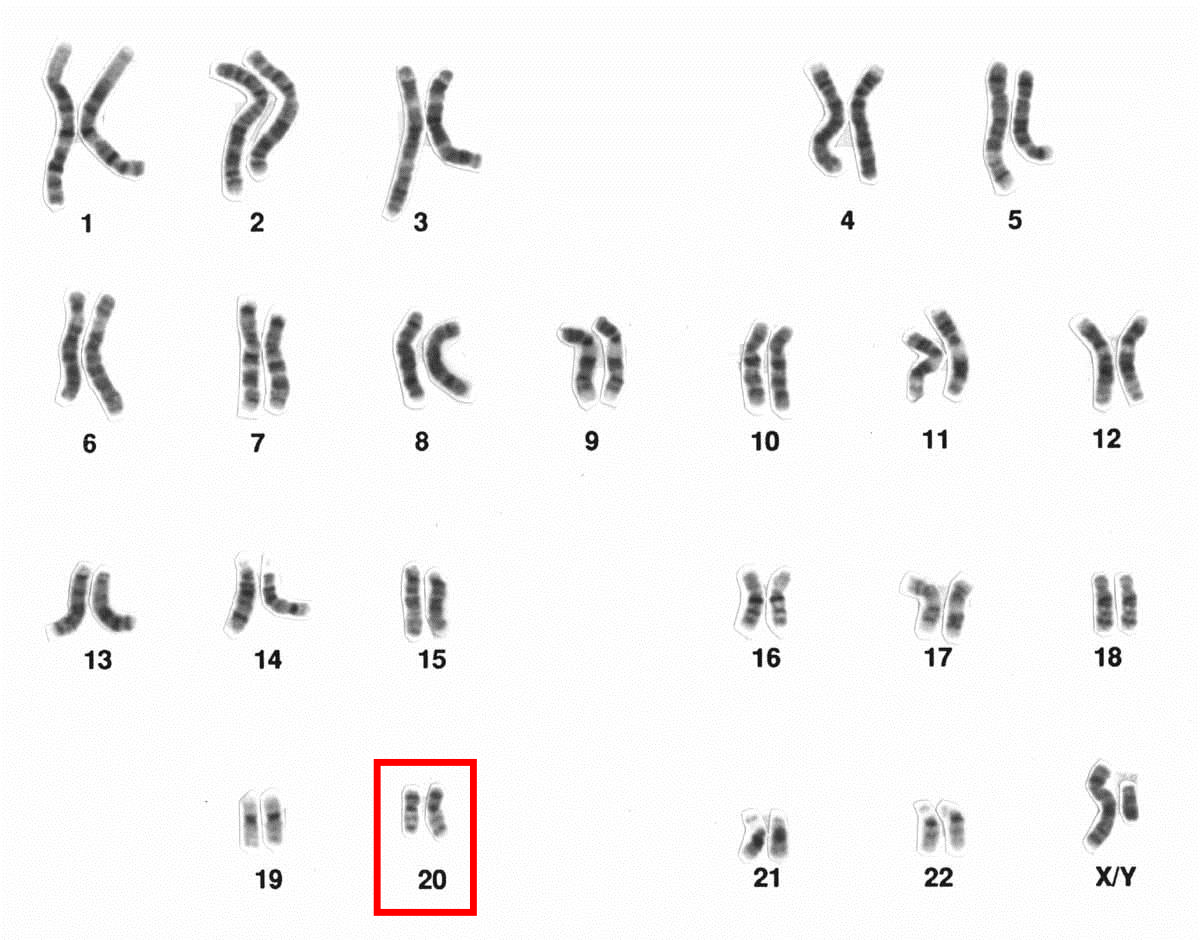
- Chromosome 20 pair in human male karyogram.

Features
- Length (bp): 66,210,255 bp (CHM13)
- No. of genes: 516 (CCDS)
- Type: Autosome
- Centromere position: Metacentric (28.1 Mbp)

Complete gene lists
- CCDS: Gene list
- HGNC: Gene list
- UniProt: Gene list
- NCBI: Gene list

External map viewers
- Ensembl: Chromosome 20
- Entrez: Chromosome 20
- NCBI: Chromosome 20
- UCSC: Chromosome 20

Full DNA sequences
- RefSeq: NC_000020 (FASTA)
- GenBank: CM000682 (FASTA)

Chromosome 20 is one of the 23 pairs of chromosomes in humans. Chromosome 20 spans around 66 million base pairs (the building material of DNA) and represents between 2 and 2.5 percent of the total DNA in cells. Chromosome 20 was fully sequenced in 2001 and was reported to contain over 59 million base pairs. Since then, due to sequencing improvements and fixes, the length of chromosome 20 has been updated to just over 66 million base pairs.

== Genes ==
=== Number of genes ===
The following are some of the gene count estimates of human chromosome 20. Because researchers use different approaches to genome annotation their predictions of the number of genes on each chromosome varies (for technical details, see gene prediction). Among various projects, the collaborative consensus coding sequence project (CCDS) takes an extremely conservative strategy. So CCDS's gene number prediction represents a lower bound on the total number of human protein-coding genes.

Estimated by	Protein-coding genes	Non-coding RNA genes	Pseudogenes	Source	Release date
CCDS	516	—	—		2016-09-08
HGNC	519	191	297		2017-05-12
Ensembl	540	594	247		2017-03-29
UniProt	550	—	—		2018-02-28
NCBI	555	487	333		2017-05-19

=== Gene list ===
The following is a partial list of genes on human chromosome 20. For complete list, see the link in the infobox on the right.

- ADA: Adenosine Deaminase (Adenosine Deaminase Deficiency)
- ADISSP: encoding protein Adipose-secreted signaling protein
- ANDP: encoding protein Activity-dependent neuroprotector homeobox
- AHCY: S-adenosylhomocysteine hydrolase
- APMAP: encoding protein Adipocyte plasma membrane-associated protein
- ARFGEF2: ADP-ribosylation factor guanine nucleotide-exchange factor 2 (brefeldin A-inhibited)
- BCAS1: Breast carcinoma-amplified sequence 1
- BLCAP: Bladder cancer associated protein
- BMP2: Bone Morphogenetic Protein 2 (osteoblast differentiation)
- BPIFA1: encoding protein BPI fold containing family A, member 1
- BPIFA2: encoding protein BPI fold containing family A, member 2
- BPIFA3: encoding protein BPI fold containing family A, member 3
- BPIFA4P: non-coding pseudogene of the BPI fold containing family A, member 4P
- BPIFB1: encoding protein BPI fold containing family B, member 1
- BPIFB2: encoding protein BPI fold containing family B, member 2
- BPIFB3: encoding protein BPI fold containing family B, member 3
- BPIFB4: encoding protein BPI fold containing family B, member 4
- BPIFB5P: non-coding pseudogene of the BPI fold containing family B, member 5P
- BPIFB6: encoding protein BPI fold containing family B, member 6
- BPIFB9P: non-coding pseudogene of the BPI fold containing family B, member 9P
- CSRP2BP: encoding protein CSRP2 binding protein
- CST9L: Cystatin-9-like
- CSTL1: Cystatin-like 1
- CTCFL: CCCTC-binding factor-like
- CTNNBL1: Beta-catenin-like protein 1
- DBNDD2: Dysbindin domain-containing protein 2
- DDX27: DEAD box polypeptide 27
- DEFB118, DEFB119, DEFB126, DEFB127, DEFB129: Beta-defensin genes
- DLGAP4: Disks large-associated protein 4
- DNAJC5: Cysteine string protein
- EDEM2: ER degradation-enhancing alpha-mannosidase-like 2
- EDN3: endothelin 3
- ENTPD6: Ectonucleoside triphosphate diphosphohydrolase 6
- ESF1: ESF1 nucleolar pre-rRNA processing protein homolog
- FAM210B: encoding protein FAM210B
- FASTKD5: encoding protein FAST kinase domain-containing protein 5 (FASTKD5)
- FITM2: encoding protein Fat storage-inducing transmembrane protein 2
- GZF1: encoding protein GDNF-inducible zinc finger protein 1
- GMEB2: Glucocorticoid modulatory element-binding protein 2
- GNAS1: Gs alpha subunit (membrane G-protein)
- GSS: glutathione synthetase
- HSPA12B: encoding protein Heat shock protein family a (hsp70) member 12b
- ITPA: encoding enzyme Inosine triphosphate pyrophosphatase
- JAG1: jagged 1 (Alagille syndrome)
- JPH2: encoding protein Junctophilin 2
- KIAA1755: encoding protein Kiaa1755
- KIZ: encoding protein Kizuna centrosomal protein
- Kua-UEV:
- L3MBTL: encoding protein Lethal(3)malignant brain tumor-like protein
- LIME1: encoding protein Lck-interacting transmembrane adapter 1
- LZTS3: encoding protein Leucine zipper, putative tumor suppressor family member 3
- MIR124-3: encoding protein MIR124-3
- MIR499A: encoding protein MicroRNA 499a
- MROH8: encoding protein maestro heat like repeat family member 8
- NAPB: encoding protein Beta-soluble NSF attachment protein
- NDUFAF5: encoding protein NADH:ubiquinone oxidoreductase complex assembly factor 5
- Nnat: encoding protein Neuronatin
- NOL5A: encoding protein Nucleolar protein 56
- NRSN2: encoding protein Neurensin-2
- OCSTAMP: encoding protein Osteoclast stimulatory transmembrane protein
- OTOR: encoding protein Otoraplin
- OXT: encoding protein Oxytocin/neurophysin i prepropeptide
- PANK2: pantothenate kinase 2 (pantothenate kinase-associated neurodegeneration)
- PKIG: encoding protein cAMP-dependent protein kinase inhibitor gamma
- PLAGL2: encoding protein Zinc finger protein PLAGL2
- POLR3F: encoding enzyme DNA-directed RNA polymerase III subunit RPC6
- PRIC285:
- PRNP: prion protein (p27-30) (Creutzfeldt–Jakob disease, Gerstmann-Strausler-Scheinker syndrome, fatal familial insomnia)
- PXMP4: encoding protein Peroxisomal membrane protein 4
- R3HDML: encoding protein R3H domain containing-like
- RTF2: encoding protein RTF2 homolog
- SALL4: sal-like 4 (Drosophila)
- SERINC3: encoding protein Serine incorporator 3
- SHLD1: encoding protein Shieldin complex subunit 1
- SLC17A9: encoding protein Solute carrier family 17 member 9
- SLC2A4RG: encoding protein SLC2A4 regulator
- SLX4IP: encoding protein SLX4 interacting protein
- SNPH: encoding protein Syntaphilin
- SPATA2: encoding protein Spermatogenesis-associated protein 2
- SPEF1: encoding protein Sperm flagellar protein 1
- SRXN1: encoding protein Sulfiredoxin-1
- STAU1: encoding protein Double-stranded RNA-binding protein Staufen homolog 1
- STK35L1: encoding protein STK35L1
- SUN5: encoding protein SUN domain-containing protein 5
- TASP1: encoding enzyme Threonine aspartase 1
- tTG: tissue transglutaminase (auto antigen of Celiac disease)
- TMEPAI: encoding protein Transmembrane prostate androgen-induced protein
- TTPAL: encoding protein Tocopherol (alpha) transfer protein-like
- UCKL1: encoding enzyme Uridine-cytidine kinase-like 1
- UQCC: encoding enzyme Ubiquinol-cytochrome c reductase complex chaperone CBP3 homolog
- VAPB: VAMP (vesicle-associated membrane protein)-associated protein B and C
- YTHDF1: encoding protein YTH domain family, member 1
- ZFP64 encoding protein Zinc finger protein 64 homolog, isoforms 1 and 2
- ZGPAT: encoding protein Zinc finger CCCH-type with G patch domain-containing protein
- ZHX3: encoding protein Zinc fingers and homeoboxes protein 3
- ZNF334: encoding protein Zinc finger protein 334
- ZNF343: encoding protein Zinc finger protein 343
- ZSWIM3: encoding protein Zinc finger SWIM-type containing 3
- ZMYND8: encoding enzyme Protein kinase C-binding protein 1
- ZNF133: encoding protein Zinc finger protein 133

== Diseases and disorders ==
The following diseases are some of those related to genes on chromosome 20:

- Albright's hereditary osteodystrophy
- Arterial tortuosity syndrome
- Adenosine deaminase deficiency
- Alagille syndrome
- Galactosialidosis - CTSA
- Maturity onset diabetes of the young type 1
- Neuronal ceroid lipofuscinosis
- Pantothenate kinase-associated neurodegeneration
- Waardenburg syndrome type 4B
- CARASAL
- Creutzfeldt-Jakob disease

== Cytogenetic band ==
G-banding ideograms of human chromosome 20

G-banding ideogram of human chromosome 20 in resolution 850 bphs. Band length in this diagram is proportional to base-pair length. This type of ideogram is generally used in genome browsers (e.g. Ensembl, UCSC Genome Browser).

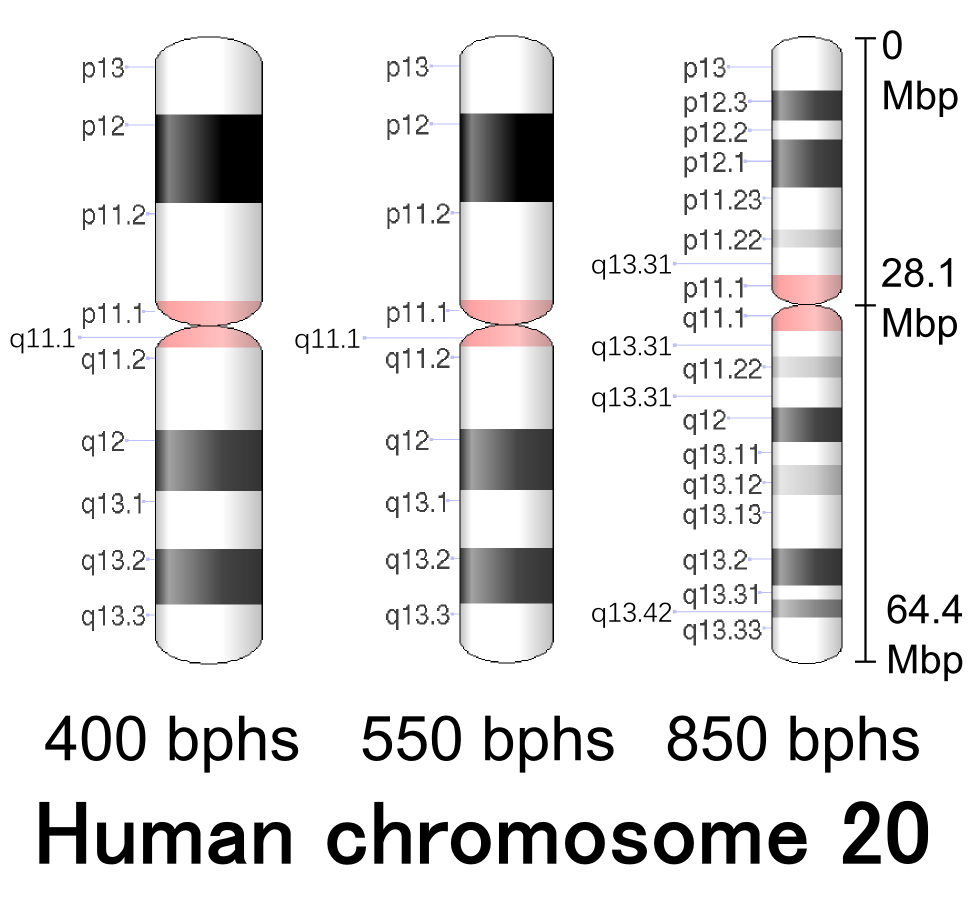
G-banding patterns of human chromosome 20 in three different resolutions (400, 550 and 850). Band length in this diagram is based on the ideograms from ISCN (2013). This type of ideogram represents actual relative band length observed under a microscope at the different moments during the mitotic process.

G-bands of human chromosome 20 in resolution 850 bphs
Chr.	Arm	Band	ISCN start	ISCN stop	Basepair start	Basepair stop	Stain	Density
20	p	13	0	333	1	5,100,000	gneg	
20	p	12.3	333	513	5,100,001	9,200,000	gpos	75
20	p	12.2	513	624	9,200,001	12,000,000	gneg	
20	p	12.1	624	915	12,000,001	17,900,000	gpos	75
20	p	11.23	915	1164	17,900,001	21,300,000	gneg	
20	p	11.22	1164	1275	21,300,001	22,300,000	gpos	25
20	p	11.21	1275	1441	22,300,001	25,700,000	gneg	
20	p	11.1	1441	1608	25,700,001	28,100,000	acen	
20	q	11.1	1608	1774	28,100,001	30,400,000	acen	
20	q	11.21	1774	1927	30,400,001	33,500,000	gneg	
20	q	11.22	1927	2051	33,500,001	35,800,000	gpos	25
20	q	11.23	2051	2232	35,800,001	39,000,000	gneg	
20	q	12	2232	2439	39,000,001	43,100,000	gpos	75
20	q	13.11	2439	2578	43,100,001	43,500,000	gneg	
20	q	13.12	2578	2758	43,500,001	47,800,000	gpos	25
20	q	13.13	2758	3077	47,800,001	51,200,000	gneg	
20	q	13.2	3077	3299	51,200,001	56,400,000	gpos	75
20	q	13.31	3299	3382	56,400,001	57,800,000	gneg	
20	q	13.32	3382	3493	57,800,001	59,700,000	gpos	50
20	q	13.33	3493	3770	59,700,001	64,444,167	gneg	
