= SERINC3 =

Protein-coding gene in the species Homo sapiens

Identifiers
- Aliases: SERINC3, AIGP1, DIFF33, SBBI99, TDE, TDE1, TMS-1, serine incorporator 3
- External IDs: OMIM: 607165; MGI: 1349457; GeneCards: SERINC3

Gene location (Human)
Chr.	Chromosome 20 (human)
Band	20q13.12	Start	44,496,221 bp
Band	20q13.12	End	44,522,085 bp

Gene location (Mouse)
Chr.	Chromosome 2 (mouse)
Band	2|2 H3	Start	163,465,192 bp
Band	2|2 H3	End	163,487,051 bp
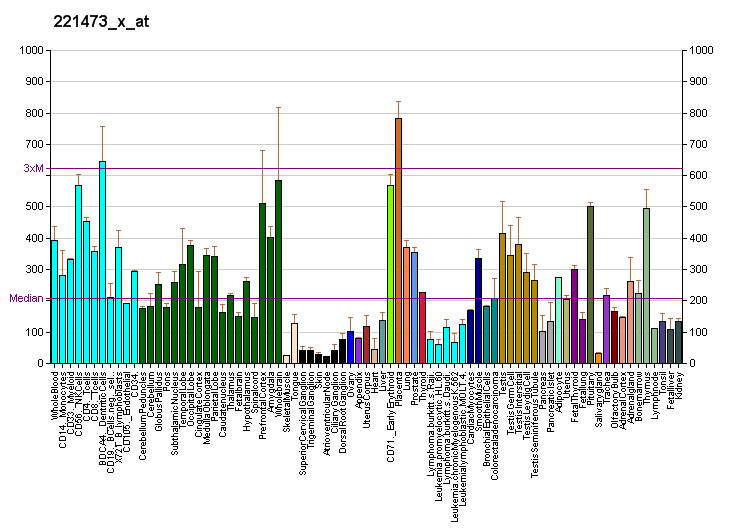

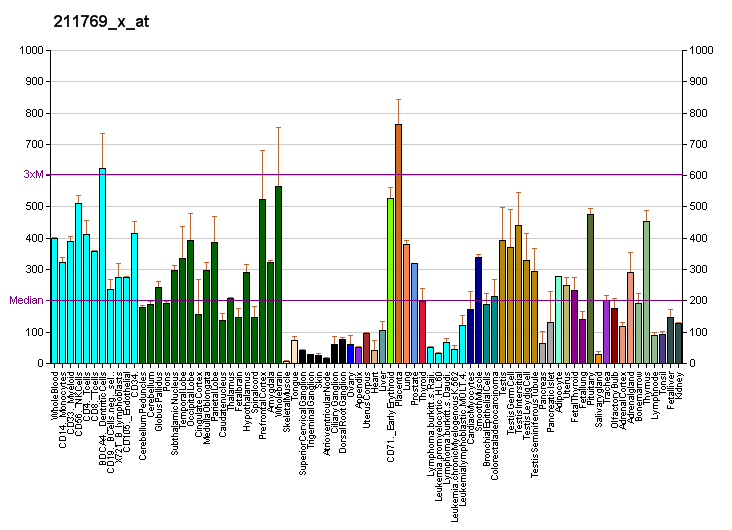

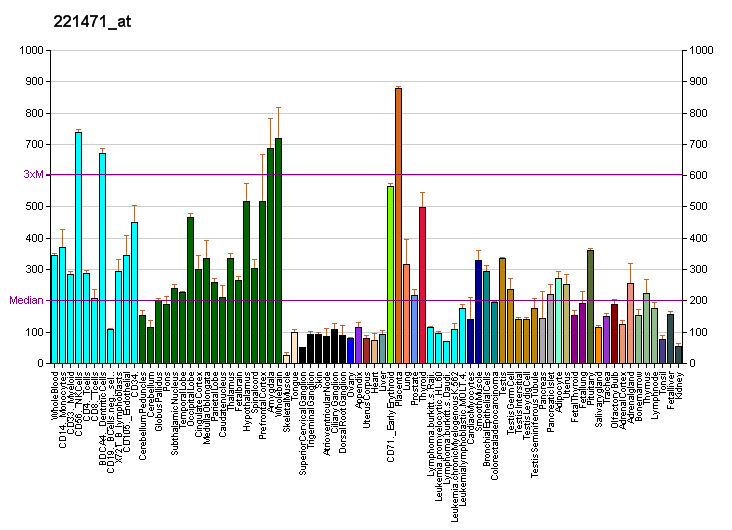
RNA expression pattern
Bgee	Human / Mouse (ortholog); Top expressed in: endothelial cell; tendon of biceps brachii; pons; internal globus pallidus; Brodmann area 23; middle temporal gyrus; superior frontal gyrus; stromal cell of endometrium; postcentral gyrus; prefrontal cortex / Top expressed in: lobe of prostate; seminal vesicula; stroma of bone marrow; left lung lobe; blood; Paneth cell; median eminence; parotid gland; Gonadal ridge; crypt of lieberkuhn of small intestine; More reference expression data
BioGPS	More reference expression data
Gene ontology
Molecular function	L-serine transmembrane transporter activity
Cellular component	integral component of membrane; Golgi membrane; Golgi apparatus; membrane; cytoplasm; perinuclear region of cytoplasm; plasma membrane
Biological process	phosphatidylserine metabolic process; detection of virus; innate immune response; defense response to virus; positive regulation of endoplasmic reticulum stress-induced intrinsic apoptotic signaling pathway; sphingolipid metabolic process; L-serine transport; immune system process; L-serine biosynthetic process
Sources:Amigo / QuickGO
Orthologs
Databases	NCBI: entry; OMA: entry
Species	Human	Mouse
Entrez	10955	26943
Ensembl	ENSG00000132824	ENSMUSG00000017707
UniProt	Q13530	Q9QZI9
RefSeq (mRNA)	NM_198941; NM_006811	NM_012032
RefSeq (protein)	NP_006802; NP_945179	NP_036162
Location (UCSC)	Chr 20: 44.5 – 44.52 Mb	Chr 2: 163.47 – 163.49 Mb
PubMed search
- Wikidata
View/Edit Human	View/Edit Mouse

Serine incorporator 3 is a protein that in humans is encoded by the SERINC3 gene. It has been demonstrated that SERINC3 acts as a retrovirus restriction factor.
