= SRXN1 =

Protein-coding gene in the species Homo sapiens

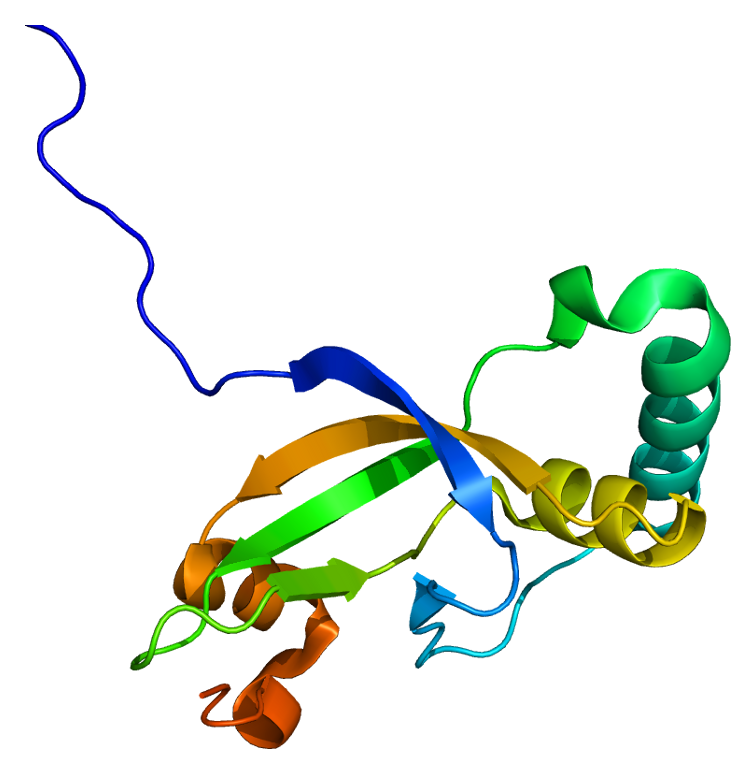
Available structures
PDB	Ortholog search: PDBe RCSB
PDB	List of PDB id codes 1XW4, 1YZS, 2B6F, 2RII, 3CYI, 3HY2

Identifiers
- Aliases: SRXN1, C20orf139, Npn3, SRX, SRX1, sulfiredoxin 1
- External IDs: OMIM: 617583; MGI: 104971; HomoloGene: 32722; GeneCards: SRXN1; OMA:SRXN1 - orthologs

Gene location (Human)
Chr.	Chromosome 20 (human)
Band	20p13	Start	646,615 bp
Band	20p13	End	653,200 bp

Gene location (Mouse)
Chr.	Chromosome 2 (mouse)
Band	2|2 G3	Start	151,947,436 bp
Band	2|2 G3	End	151,953,296 bp
RNA expression pattern
Bgee	Human / Mouse (ortholog); Top expressed in: islet of Langerhans; left adrenal gland; left adrenal cortex; right adrenal cortex; stromal cell of endometrium; left ventricle; right auricle of heart; gastrocnemius muscle; apex of heart; right frontal lobe / Top expressed in: adrenal gland; ileum; jejunum; duodenum; pituitary gland; pontine nuclei; blood; gastrula; lateral geniculate nucleus; ankle joint; More reference expression data
BioGPS	n/a
Gene ontology
Molecular function	nucleotide binding; oxidoreductase activity; antioxidant activity; ATP binding; oxidoreductase activity, acting on a sulfur group of donors; sulfiredoxin activity; protein binding
Cellular component	cytoplasm; cytosol
Biological process	cellular oxidant detoxification; response to oxidative stress; cellular response to oxidative stress
Sources:Amigo / QuickGO
Orthologs
Species	Human	Mouse
Entrez	140809	76650
Ensembl	ENSG00000271303	ENSMUSG00000032802
UniProt	Q9BYN0	Q9D975
RefSeq (mRNA)	NM_080725	NM_029688
RefSeq (protein)	NP_542763	NP_083964
Location (UCSC)	Chr 20: 0.65 – 0.65 Mb	Chr 2: 151.95 – 151.95 Mb
PubMed search
- Wikidata
View/Edit Human	View/Edit Mouse

Sulfiredoxin-1 is a protein that in humans is encoded by the SRXN1 gene.
