= Zinc finger swim-type containing 3 =

Protein-coding gene in the species Homo sapiens

ZSWIM3

Identifiers
- Aliases: ZSWIM3, C20orf164, PPP1R174, zinc finger SWIM-type containing 3
- External IDs: MGI: 1914788; GeneCards: ZSWIM3

Gene location (Human)
Chr.	Chromosome 20 (human)
Band	20q13.12	Start	45,857,614 bp
Band	20q13.12	End	45,879,122 bp

Gene location (Mouse)
Chr.	Chromosome 2 (mouse)
Band	2|2 H3	Start	164,647,018 bp
Band	2|2 H3	End	164,664,050 bp
RNA expression pattern
Bgee	Human / Mouse (ortholog); Top expressed in: oocyte; secondary oocyte; gonad; testicle; granulocyte; pancreatic ductal cell; mucosa of transverse colon; endothelial cell; stromal cell of endometrium; right adrenal gland / Top expressed in: secondary oocyte; primary oocyte; zygote; spermatocyte; spermatid; seminiferous tubule; yolk sac; morula; granulocyte; embryo; More reference expression data
BioGPS	n/a
Orthologs
Databases	NCBI: entry; OMA: entry
Species	Human	Mouse
Entrez	140831	67538
Ensembl	ENSG00000132801	ENSMUSG00000045822
UniProt	Q96MP5	Q8CFL8
RefSeq (mRNA)	NM_080752	NM_178375
RefSeq (protein)	NP_542790	NP_848462
Location (UCSC)	Chr 20: 45.86 – 45.88 Mb	Chr 2: 164.65 – 164.66 Mb
PubMed search
- Wikidata
View/Edit Human	View/Edit Mouse

Zinc finger SWIM-type containing 3 is a protein that in humans is encoded by the ZSWIM3 gene.
