= L3MBTL =

Lethal(3)malignant brain tumor-like protein

L3MBTL1
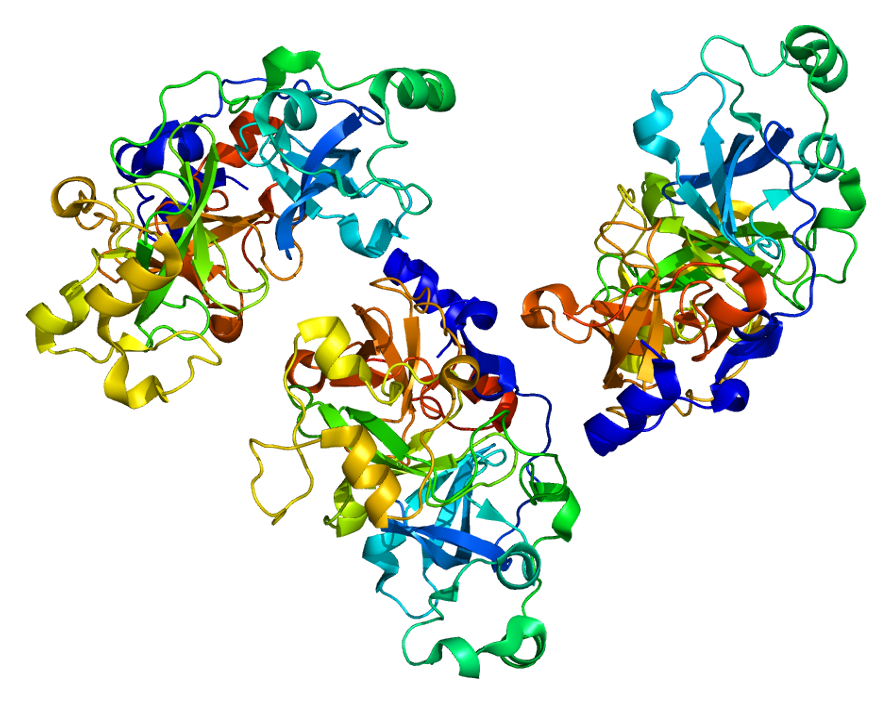

Identifiers
- Aliases: L3MBTL1, H-L(3)MBT, L3MBTL, ZC2HC3, dJ138B7.3, l(3)mbt-like 1 (Drosophila), histone methyl-lysine binding protein, L3MBTL histone methyl-lysine binding protein 1
- External IDs: OMIM: 608802; MGI: 2676663; GeneCards: L3MBTL1
Available structures
PDB	Ortholog search: PDBe RCSB
PDB	List of PDB id codes 1OYX, 1OZ2, 1OZ3, 2PQW, 2RHI, 2RHU, 2RHX, 2RHY, 2RHZ, 2RI2, 2RI3, 2RI5, 2RJC, 2RJD, 2RJE, 2RJF, 3OQ5, 3P8H, 3UWN

Gene location (Human)
Chr.	Chromosome 20 (human)
Band	20q13.12	Start	43,489,442 bp
Band	20q13.12	End	43,550,950 bp

Gene location (Mouse)
Chr.	Chromosome 2 (mouse)
Band	2|2 H2	Start	162,943,472 bp
Band	2|2 H2	End	162,974,522 bp
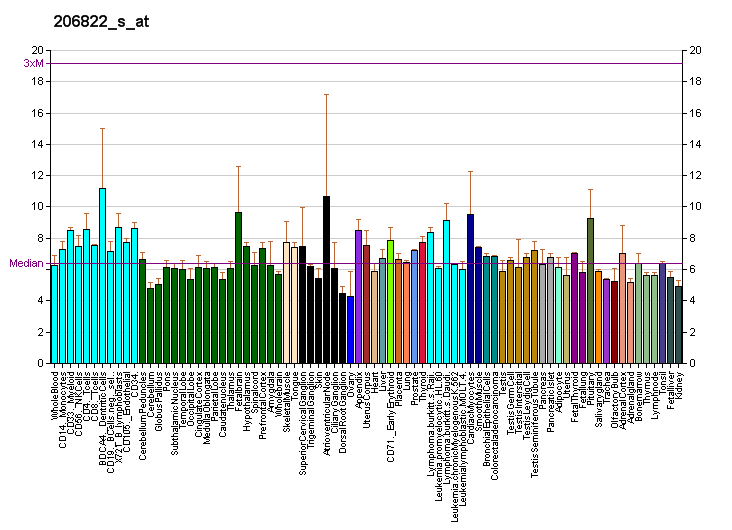

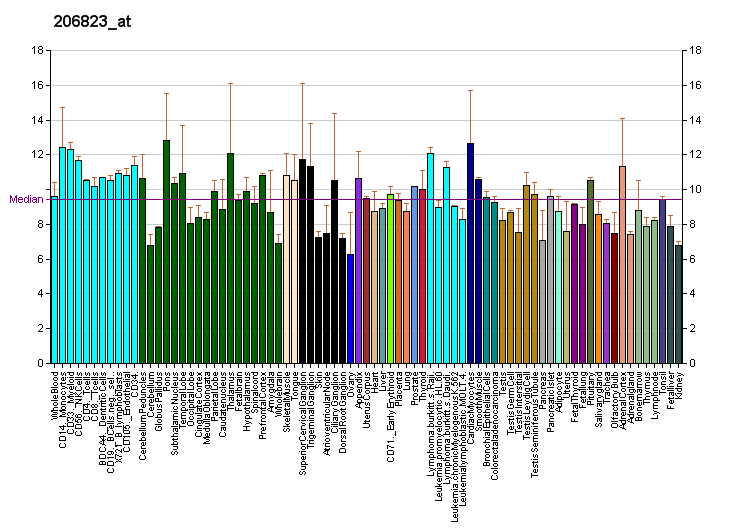

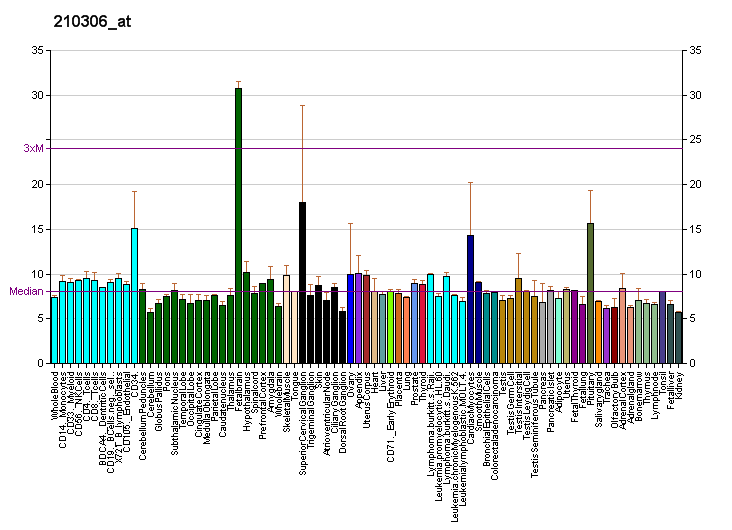
RNA expression pattern
Bgee	Human / Mouse (ortholog); Top expressed in: right hemisphere of cerebellum; pituitary gland; anterior pituitary; subthalamic nucleus; right uterine tube; tongue; right frontal lobe; superior surface of tongue; superior vestibular nucleus; glutes / Top expressed in: hypothalamus; zygote; respiratory epithelium; female urethra; olfactory epithelium; primary visual cortex; superior frontal gyrus; ureter; striatum of neuraxis; cerebellum; More reference expression data
BioGPS	More reference expression data
Gene ontology
Molecular function	DNA-binding transcription factor activity; histone binding; zinc ion binding; SAM domain binding; chromatin binding; metal ion binding; methylated histone binding; protein binding; identical protein binding; nucleosome binding
Cellular component	plasma membrane; nucleolus; chromatin; condensed chromosome; nucleus; nucleoplasm
Biological process	regulation of transcription, DNA-templated; transcription, DNA-templated; regulation of cell cycle; negative regulation of transcription, DNA-templated; regulation of megakaryocyte differentiation; regulation of mitotic nuclear division; regulation of signal transduction by p53 class mediator; chromatin organization; hemopoiesis
Sources:Amigo / QuickGO
Orthologs
Databases	NCBI: entry; OMA: entry
Species	Human	Mouse
Entrez	26013	241764
Ensembl	ENSG00000185513	ENSMUSG00000035576
UniProt	Q9Y468	A2A5N8
RefSeq (mRNA)	NM_032107; NM_015478	NM_001081338
RefSeq (protein)	NP_056293; NP_115479	NP_001074807
Location (UCSC)	Chr 20: 43.49 – 43.55 Mb	Chr 2: 162.94 – 162.97 Mb
PubMed search
- Wikidata
View/Edit Human	View/Edit Mouse

Lethal(3)malignant brain tumor-like protein is a protein that in humans is encoded by the L3MBTL1 gene (previously L3MBTL).

This gene encodes the homolog of a protein identified in Drosophila as a suppressor of malignant transformation of neuroblasts and ganglion mother cells in the optic centers of the brain. This gene product is localized to condensed chromosomes in mitotic cells. Overexpression of this gene in a glioma cell line results in improper nuclear segregation and cytokinesis producing multinucleated cells. Alternatively spliced transcript variants encoding different isoforms have been identified.
