= KIAA1755 =

Protein-coding gene in the species Homo sapiens

Identifiers
- Aliases: KIAA1755
- External IDs: MGI: 3606579; GeneCards: KIAA1755

Gene location (Human)
Chr.	Chromosome 20 (human)
Band	20q11.23	Start	38,210,488 bp
Band	20q11.23	End	38,260,772 bp

Gene location (Mouse)
Chr.	Chromosome 2 (mouse)
Band	2|2 H1	Start	158,024,453 bp
Band	2|2 H1	End	158,071,142 bp
RNA expression pattern
Bgee	Human / Mouse (ortholog); Top expressed in: sural nerve; C1 segment; Descending thoracic aorta; canal of the cervix; body of uterus; gastric mucosa; putamen; ascending aorta; right auricle of heart; tendon of biceps brachii / Top expressed in: adrenal gland; limb; ventricular zone; ganglionic eminence; heart; urinary bladder; quadriceps femoris muscle; embryo; superior frontal gyrus; dentate gyrus of hippocampal formation granule cell; More reference expression data
BioGPS	n/a
Orthologs
Databases	NCBI: entry; OMA: entry
Species	Human	Mouse
Entrez	85449	228846
Ensembl	ENSG00000149633	ENSMUSG00000037813
UniProt	Q5JYT7	Q8BWG4
RefSeq (mRNA)	NM_001029864; NM_001348708	NM_001131021; NM_177657
RefSeq (protein)	NP_001025035; NP_001335637	NP_001124493; NP_808325
Location (UCSC)	Chr 20: 38.21 – 38.26 Mb	Chr 2: 158.02 – 158.07 Mb
PubMed search
- Wikidata
View/Edit Human	View/Edit Mouse

Uncharacterized protein KIAA1755 is a protein that in humans is encoded by the KIAA1755 gene.
