= MicroRNA 499a =

Non-coding RNA in the species Homo sapiens

MIR499A

Identifiers
- Aliases: MIR499A, MIR499, MIRN499, hsa-mir-499a, mir-499a, microRNA 499a
- External IDs: OMIM: 613614; GeneCards: MIR499A; OMA:MIR499A - orthologs

Gene location (Human)
Chr.	Chromosome 20 (human)
Band	20q11.22	Start	34,990,376 bp
Band	20q11.22	End	34,990,497 bp
RNA expression pattern
Bgee	Human / Mouse (ortholog); Top expressed in: right uterine tube; pituitary gland; anterior pituitary; olfactory zone of nasal mucosa; ectocervix; body of pancreas; skeletal muscle tissue; myometrium; left ovary; monocyte / n/a; More reference expression data
BioGPS	n/a
Orthologs
Species	Human	Mouse
Entrez	574501	n/a
Ensembl	ENSG00000207635	n/a
UniProt	n a	n/a
RefSeq (mRNA)	n/a	n/a
RefSeq (protein)	n/a	n/a
Location (UCSC)	Chr 20: 34.99 – 34.99 Mb	n/a
PubMed search		n/a
- Wikidata
View/Edit Human

MicroRNA 499a is a non-coding RNA that in humans is encoded by the MIR499A gene.

== Function ==
microRNAs (miRNAs) are short (20-24 nt) non-coding RNAs that are involved in post-transcriptional regulation of gene expression in multicellular organisms by affecting both the stability and translation of mRNAs. miRNAs are transcribed by RNA polymerase II as part of capped and polyadenylated primary transcripts (pri-miRNAs) that can be either protein-coding or non-coding. The primary transcript is cleaved by the Drosha ribonuclease III enzyme to produce an approximately 70-nt stem-loop precursor miRNA (pre-miRNA), which is further cleaved by the cytoplasmic Dicer ribonuclease to generate the mature miRNA and antisense miRNA star (miRNA*) products. The mature miRNA is incorporated into a RNA-induced silencing complex (RISC), which recognizes target mRNAs through imperfect base pairing with the miRNA and most commonly results in translational inhibition or destabilization of the target mRNA. The RefSeq represents the predicted microRNA stem-loop.
