= DEFB118 =

Protein-coding gene in humans

Identifiers
- Aliases: DEFB118, C20orf63, DEFB-18, ESC42, ESP13.6, defensin beta 118
- External IDs: OMIM: 607650; GeneCards: DEFB118

Gene location (Human)
Chr.	Chromosome 20 (human)
Band	20q11.21	Start	31,368,601 bp
Band	20q11.21	End	31,373,923 bp
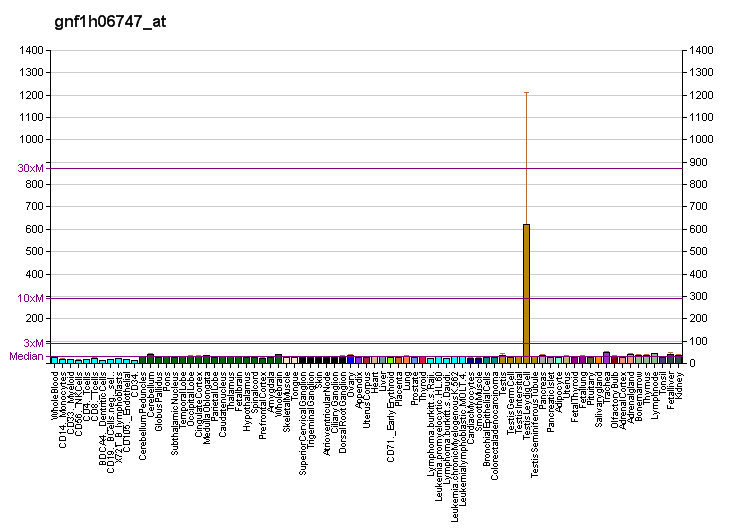
RNA expression pattern
Bgee	Human / Mouse (ortholog); Top expressed in: corpus epididymis; caput epididymis; tail of epididymis; fallopian tube; gonad; testicle / n/a; More reference expression data
BioGPS	More reference expression data
Orthologs
Databases	NCBI: entry; OMA: entry
Species	Human	Mouse
Entrez	117285	n/a
Ensembl	ENSG00000131068	n/a
UniProt	Q96PH6	n/a
RefSeq (mRNA)	NM_054112	n/a
RefSeq (protein)	NP_473453	n/a
Location (UCSC)	Chr 20: 31.37 – 31.37 Mb	n/a
PubMed search		n/a
- Wikidata
View/Edit Human

Beta-defensin 118 is a protein that in humans is encoded by the DEFB118 gene.
