= Osteoclast stimulatory transmembrane protein =

Protein-coding gene in the species Homo sapiens

OCSTAMP

Identifiers
- Aliases: OCSTAMP, C20orf123, OC-STAMP, dJ257E24.3, osteoclast stimulatory transmembrane protein
- External IDs: MGI: 1921864; HomoloGene: 41768; GeneCards: OCSTAMP; OMA:OCSTAMP - orthologs

Gene location (Human)
Chr.	Chromosome 20 (human)
Band	20q13.12	Start	46,540,946 bp
Band	20q13.12	End	46,550,654 bp

Gene location (Mouse)
Chr.	Chromosome 2 (mouse)
Band	2|2 H3	Start	165,235,680 bp
Band	2|2 H3	End	165,242,325 bp
RNA expression pattern
Bgee	Human / Mouse (ortholog); Top expressed in: substantia nigra; subcutaneous adipose tissue; human kidney / Top expressed in: membranous bone; maxilla; body of femur; mandible; granulocyte; jejunum; sexually immature organism; duodenum; liver; cochlea; More reference expression data
BioGPS	n/a
Orthologs
Species	Human	Mouse
Entrez	128506	74614
Ensembl	ENSG00000149635	ENSMUSG00000027670
UniProt	Q9BR26	Q9D611
RefSeq (mRNA)	NM_080721	NM_029021
RefSeq (protein)	NP_542452	NP_083297
Location (UCSC)	Chr 20: 46.54 – 46.55 Mb	Chr 2: 165.24 – 165.24 Mb
PubMed search
- Wikidata
View/Edit Human	View/Edit Mouse

Osteoclast stimulatory transmembrane protein is a protein that in humans is encoded by the OCSTAMP gene.
