= TTPAL =

Protein-coding gene in the species Homo sapiens

Identifiers
- Aliases: TTPAL, C20orf121, tocopherol (alpha) transfer protein-like, alpha tocopherol transfer protein like
- External IDs: MGI: 1923330; GeneCards: TTPAL

Gene location (Human)
Chr.	Chromosome 20 (human)
Band	20q13.12	Start	44,475,874 bp
Band	20q13.12	End	44,494,603 bp

Gene location (Mouse)
Chr.	Chromosome 2 (mouse)
Band	2|2 H3	Start	163,444,234 bp
Band	2|2 H3	End	163,460,933 bp
RNA expression pattern
Bgee	Human / Mouse (ortholog); Top expressed in: decidua; gingival epithelium; liver; right lobe of liver; tibia; secondary oocyte; nipple; trabecular bone; stromal cell of endometrium; internal globus pallidus / Top expressed in: esophagus; gastrula; superior frontal gyrus; lip; primary visual cortex; superior cervical ganglion; hand; thymus; zygote; trigeminal ganglion; More reference expression data
BioGPS	n/a
Gene ontology
Molecular function	transporter activity
Cellular component	intracellular anatomical structure; membrane
Biological process	transport
Sources:Amigo / QuickGO
Orthologs
Databases	NCBI: entry; OMA: entry
Species	Human	Mouse
Entrez	79183	76080
Ensembl	ENSG00000124120	ENSMUSG00000017679
UniProt	Q9BTX7	Q9D3D0
RefSeq (mRNA)	NM_001039199; NM_001261839; NM_024331	NM_029512; NM_181734; NM_001305803
RefSeq (protein)	NP_001034288; NP_001248768; NP_077307	NP_001292732; NP_083788; NP_859423
Location (UCSC)	Chr 20: 44.48 – 44.49 Mb	Chr 2: 163.44 – 163.46 Mb
PubMed search
- Wikidata
View/Edit Human	View/Edit Mouse

Tocopherol (alpha) transfer protein-like is a protein that in humans is encoded by the TTPAL gene.
