= DBNDD2 =

Protein-coding gene in the species Homo sapiens

Identifiers
- Aliases: DBNDD2, C20orf35, CK1BP, HSMNP1, dysbindin domain containing 2
- External IDs: OMIM: 611453; MGI: 106562; HomoloGene: 12276; GeneCards: DBNDD2; OMA:DBNDD2 - orthologs

Gene location (Human)
Chr.	Chromosome 20 (human)
Band	20q13.12	Start	45,406,057 bp
Band	20q13.12	End	45,410,610 bp

Gene location (Mouse)
Chr.	Chromosome 2 (mouse)
Band	2 H3|2 85.17 cM	Start	164,328,026 bp
Band	2 H3|2 85.17 cM	End	164,335,239 bp
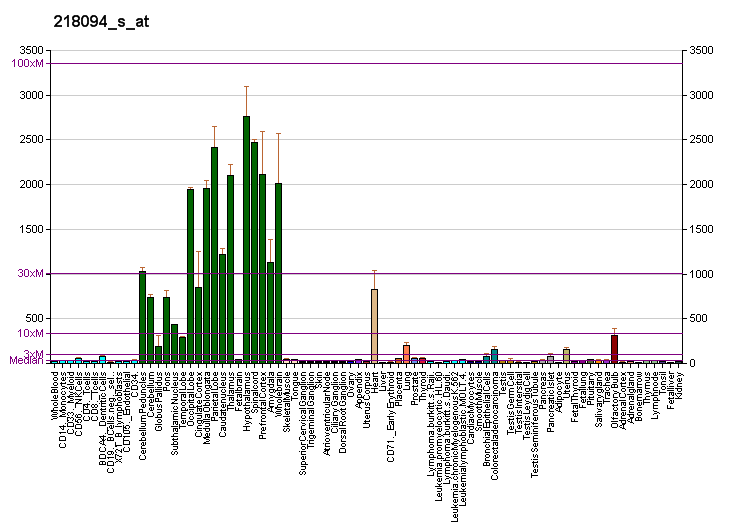
RNA expression pattern
Bgee	Human / Mouse (ortholog); Top expressed in: C1 segment; corpus callosum; substantia nigra; hippocampus proper; primary visual cortex; putamen; temporal lobe; amygdala; apex of heart; left ventricle / Top expressed in: lumbar subsegment of spinal cord; dentate gyrus of hippocampal formation granule cell; superior frontal gyrus; primary visual cortex; cerebellar cortex; lip; neural layer of retina; anterior horn of spinal cord; esophagus; right kidney; More reference expression data
BioGPS	More reference expression data
Gene ontology
Molecular function	protein binding
Cellular component	cytoplasm; synaptic vesicle membrane
Biological process	negative regulation of protein kinase activity; neuron projection development
Sources:Amigo / QuickGO
Orthologs
Species	Human	Mouse
Entrez	55861	52840
Ensembl	ENSG00000244274	ENSMUSG00000017734
UniProt	Q9BQY9	Q9CRD4
RefSeq (mRNA)	NM_018478; NM_001048221; NM_001048222; NM_001048223; NM_001048224 NM_001048225; NM_001048226; NM_001197139; NM_001197140	NM_001048227; NM_001048228; NM_001048229; NM_026797
RefSeq (protein)	NP_001041686; NP_001041687; NP_001041688; NP_001041689; NP_001041690 NP_001041691; NP_001184068; NP_001184069; NP_060948	NP_001041692; NP_001041693; NP_001041694; NP_081073
Location (UCSC)	Chr 20: 45.41 – 45.41 Mb	Chr 2: 164.33 – 164.34 Mb
PubMed search
- Wikidata
View/Edit Human	View/Edit Mouse

Dysbindin domain-containing protein 2 is a protein that in humans is encoded by the DBNDD2 gene.
