= ZMYND8 =

Protein-coding gene in the species Homo sapiens

Identifiers
- Aliases: ZMYND8, PRKCBP1, PRO2893, RACK7, zinc finger MYND-type containing 8
- External IDs: OMIM: 615713; MGI: 1918025; GeneCards: ZMYND8
Available structures
PDB	Human UniProt search: PDBe RCSB
PDB	List of PDB id codes 4COS

Gene location (Human)
Chr.	Chromosome 20 (human)
Band	20q13.12	Start	47,209,214 bp
Band	20q13.12	End	47,356,889 bp

Gene location (Mouse)
Chr.	Chromosome 2 (mouse)
Band	2|2 H3	Start	165,626,072 bp
Band	2|2 H3	End	165,740,936 bp
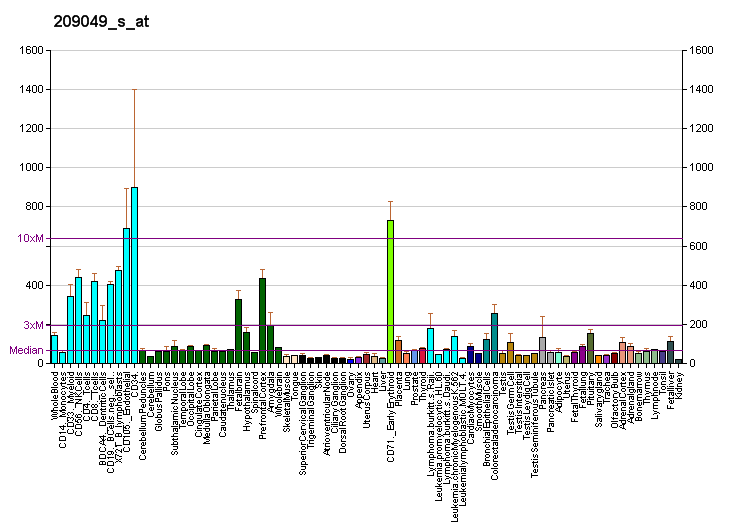

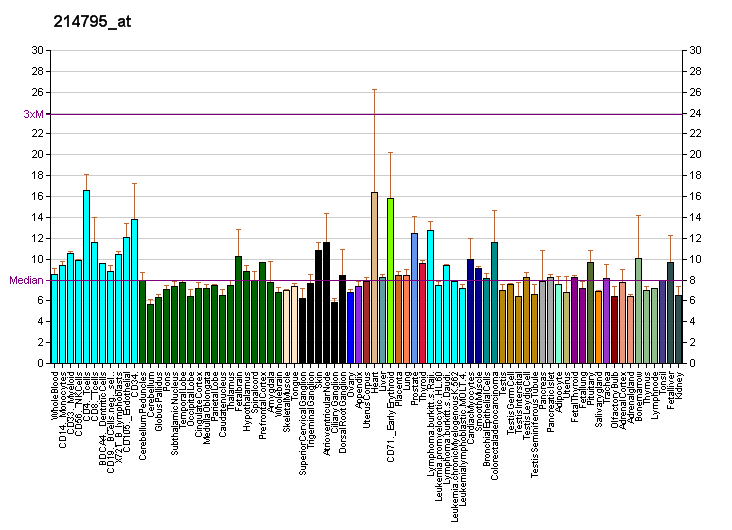

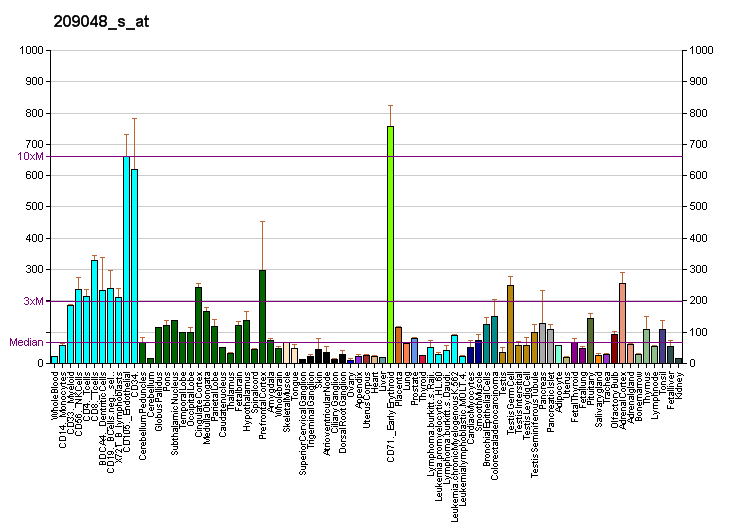
RNA expression pattern
Bgee	Human / Mouse (ortholog); Top expressed in: corpus epididymis; oocyte; caput epididymis; pons; tail of epididymis; superior surface of tongue; superior vestibular nucleus; trigeminal ganglion; trabecular bone; pylorus / Top expressed in: vestibular membrane of cochlear duct; medullary collecting duct; primitive streak; neural layer of retina; Rostral migratory stream; tail of embryo; retinal pigment epithelium; migratory enteric neural crest cell; urothelium; embryo; More reference expression data
BioGPS	More reference expression data
Gene ontology
Molecular function	transcription corepressor activity; RNA polymerase II transcription regulatory region sequence-specific DNA binding; chromatin binding; transcription coregulator activity; protein binding; metal ion binding; methylated histone binding; lysine-acetylated histone binding; protein N-terminus binding; zinc ion binding; protein domain specific binding
Cellular component	cytoplasm; dendritic shaft; dendritic spine; nucleus
Biological process	regulation of postsynaptic density protein 95 clustering; positive regulation of filopodium assembly; positive regulation of dendritic spine development; positive regulation of dendritic spine maintenance; modulation of excitatory postsynaptic potential; transcription, DNA-templated; regulation of transcription, DNA-templated; negative regulation of cell migration; negative regulation of nucleic acid-templated transcription
Sources:Amigo / QuickGO
Orthologs
Databases	NCBI: entry; OMA: entry
Species	Human	Mouse
Entrez	23613	228880
Ensembl	ENSG00000101040	ENSMUSG00000039671
UniProt	Q9ULU4	n/a
RefSeq (mRNA)	NM_001281769; NM_001281771; NM_001281772; NM_001281773; NM_001281774 NM_001281775; NM_001281776; NM_001281777; NM_001281778; NM_001281779; NM_001281780; NM_001281781; NM_001281782; NM_001281783; NM_001281784; NM_012408; NM_183047; NM_183048; NM_001363714; NM_001363741	NM_001252584; NM_001252585; NM_001252587; NM_001281926; NM_001291158 NM_027230; NM_172270; NM_001363018; NM_001363019; NM_001363020; NM_001363021
RefSeq (protein)	NP_001268698; NP_001268700; NP_001268701; NP_001268702; NP_001268703 NP_001268704; NP_001268705; NP_001268706; NP_001268707; NP_001268708; NP_001268709; NP_001268710; NP_001268711; NP_001268712; NP_001268713; NP_036540; NP_898868; NP_898869; NP_001350643; NP_001350670	n/a
Location (UCSC)	Chr 20: 47.21 – 47.36 Mb	Chr 2: 165.63 – 165.74 Mb
PubMed search
- Wikidata
View/Edit Human	View/Edit Mouse

Protein kinase C-binding protein 1 is an enzyme that in humans is encoded by the ZMYND8 gene.

The protein encoded by this gene is a receptor for activated C-kinase (RACK) protein. The encoded protein has been shown to bind in vitro to activated protein kinase C beta I. In addition, this protein is a cutaneous T-cell lymphoma-associated antigen. Finally, the protein contains a bromodomain and two zinc fingers, and is thought to be a transcriptional regulator. Multiple transcript variants encoding several different isoforms have been found for this gene.
