= Oxytocin/neurophysin I prepropeptide =

Protein-coding gene in the species Homo sapiens

OXT

Identifiers
- Aliases: OXT, OT, OT-NPI, OXT-NPI, oxytocin/neurophysin I prepropeptide
- External IDs: OMIM: 167050; MGI: 97453; HomoloGene: 55494; GeneCards: OXT; OMA:OXT - orthologs

Gene location (Human)
Chr.	Chromosome 20 (human)
Band	20p13	Start	3,071,620 bp
Band	20p13	End	3,072,517 bp

Gene location (Mouse)
Chr.	Chromosome 2 (mouse)
Band	2 F1|2 63.24 cM	Start	130,418,093 bp
Band	2 F1|2 63.24 cM	End	130,418,974 bp
RNA expression pattern
Bgee	Human / Mouse (ortholog); Top expressed in: oocyte; testicle; hypothalamus; gonad; right lobe of liver; secondary oocyte; decidua; anterior pituitary; subcutaneous adipose tissue; right adrenal gland / Top expressed in: paraventricular nucleus of hypothalamus; supraoptic nucleus; arcuate nucleus; tibiofemoral joint; nucleus of stria terminalis; right ventricle; median eminence; gastrula; neck; lateral hypothalamus; More reference expression data
BioGPS	n/a
Gene ontology
Molecular function	oxytocin receptor binding; hormone activity; neurohypophyseal hormone activity; neuropeptide hormone activity
Cellular component	terminal bouton; extracellular region; cytoplasm; secretory granule; extracellular space
Biological process	response to amphetamine; regulation of digestive system process; ejaculation; positive regulation of hindgut contraction; female pregnancy; positive regulation of penile erection; response to steroid hormone; signal transduction; response to activity; regulation of heart rate; response to sucrose; positive regulation of ossification; positive regulation of synapse assembly; drinking behavior; hyperosmotic salinity response; male mating behavior; positive regulation of cytosolic calcium ion concentration; response to estradiol; regulation of sensory perception of pain; response to cAMP; response to cocaine; response to progesterone; positive regulation of blood pressure; development of the heart; negative regulation of urine volume; response to organic cyclic compound; negative regulation of gastric acid secretion; positive regulation of prostaglandin secretion; response to peptide hormone; Maternal behavior; negative regulation of blood pressure; memory; positive regulation of norepinephrine secretion; social behavior; response to glucocorticoid; grooming behavior; response to prostaglandin E; eating behavior; response to ether; positive regulation of female receptivity; sleep; maternal aggressive behavior; positive regulation of synaptic transmission; response to electrical stimulus; positive regulation of uterine smooth muscle contraction; response to food; response to retinoic acid; positive regulation of renal sodium excretion; regulation of signaling receptor activity; G protein-coupled receptor signaling pathway
Sources:Amigo / QuickGO
Orthologs
Species	Human	Mouse
Entrez	5020	18429
Ensembl	ENSG00000101405	ENSMUSG00000027301
UniProt	P01178	P35454
RefSeq (mRNA)	NM_000915	NM_011025
RefSeq (protein)	NP_000906	NP_035155
Location (UCSC)	Chr 20: 3.07 – 3.07 Mb	Chr 2: 130.42 – 130.42 Mb
PubMed search
- Wikidata
View/Edit Human	View/Edit Mouse

Oxytocin/neurophysin I prepropeptide is a protein that in humans is encoded by the OXT gene.

== Function ==
This gene encodes a precursor protein that is processed to produce oxytocin and neurophysin I. Oxytocin is a posterior pituitary hormone that is synthesized as an inactive precursor in the hypothalamus along with its carrier protein neurophysin I. Together with neurophysin, it is packaged into neurosecretory vesicles and transported axonally to the nerve endings in the neurohypophysis, where it is either stored or secreted into the bloodstream. The precursor seems to be activated while it is being transported along the axon to the posterior pituitary. This hormone contracts smooth muscle during parturition and lactation. It is also involved in cognition, tolerance, adaptation, and complex sexual and maternal behavior, as well as in the regulation of water excretion and cardiovascular functions. [provided by RefSeq, Dec 2013].
