= ZFP64 =

Protein-coding gene in the species Homo sapiens

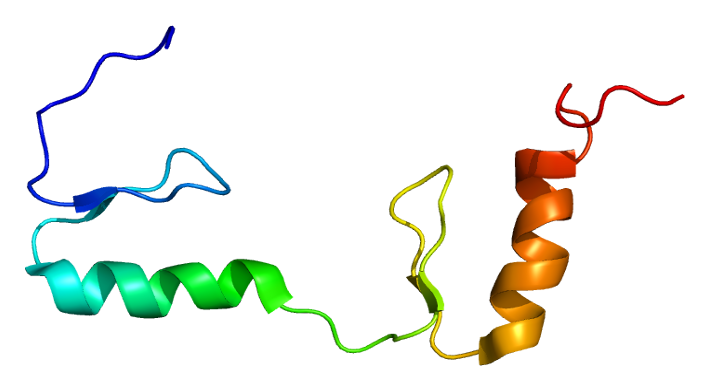

Identifiers
- Aliases: ZFP64, ZNF338, ZFP64 zinc finger protein
- External IDs: OMIM: 618111; MGI: 107342; GeneCards: ZFP64
Available structures
PDB	Ortholog search: PDBe RCSB
PDB	List of PDB id codes 1X5W, 2DMD

Gene location (Human)
Chr.	Chromosome 20 (human)
Band	20q13.2	Start	52,051,663 bp
Band	20q13.2	End	52,204,308 bp

Gene location (Mouse)
Chr.	Chromosome 2 (mouse)
Band	2 H3|2 88.99 cM	Start	168,735,251 bp
Band	2 H3|2 88.99 cM	End	168,797,507 bp
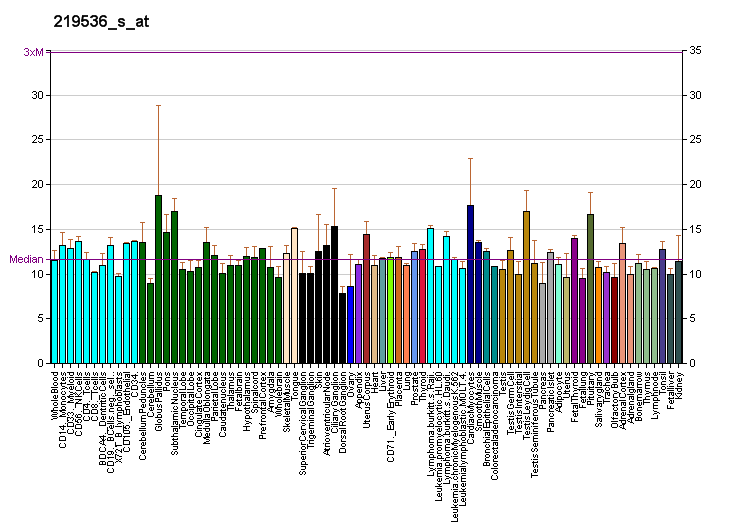

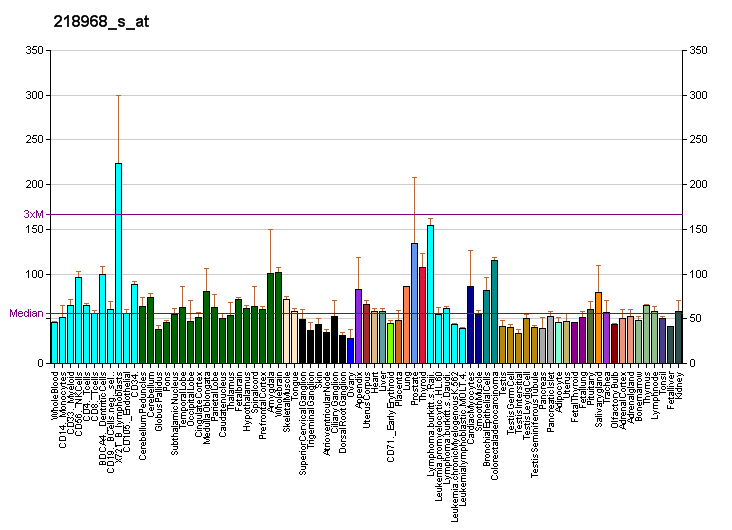
RNA expression pattern
Bgee	Human / Mouse (ortholog); Top expressed in: germinal epithelium; gingival epithelium; secondary oocyte; palpebral conjunctiva; parietal pleura; endothelial cell; visceral pleura; hair follicle; epithelium of esophagus; lactiferous duct / Top expressed in: yolk sac; Rostral migratory stream; placenta; female urethra; fossa; endocardial cushion; condyle; embryo; epiblast; embryo; More reference expression data
BioGPS	More reference expression data
Gene ontology
Molecular function	DNA binding; protein binding; metal ion binding; nucleic acid binding; DNA-binding transcription factor activity, RNA polymerase II-specific; RNA polymerase II core promoter sequence-specific DNA binding
Cellular component	nucleus; histone methyltransferase complex
Biological process	regulation of transcription, DNA-templated; transcription, DNA-templated; regulation of transcription by RNA polymerase II; regulation of gene expression
Sources:Amigo / QuickGO
Orthologs
Databases	NCBI: entry; OMA: entry
Species	Human	Mouse
Entrez	55734	22722
Ensembl	ENSG00000020256	ENSMUSG00000027551
UniProt	Q9NTW7	Q99KE8
RefSeq (mRNA)	NM_018197; NM_022088; NM_199426; NM_199427; NM_001319146	NM_009564; NM_001369059; NM_001370946
RefSeq (protein)	NP_001306075; NP_060667; NP_071371; NP_955458; NP_955459 NP_955459.2; NP_001306075.1	NP_033590; NP_001355988; NP_001357875
Location (UCSC)	Chr 20: 52.05 – 52.2 Mb	Chr 2: 168.74 – 168.8 Mb
PubMed search
- Wikidata
View/Edit Human	View/Edit Mouse

Zinc finger protein 64 homolog, isoforms 1 and 2 is a protein that in humans is encoded by the ZFP64 gene.

== See also ==
- Homolog
- Protein isoform
- Zinc finger
