= EDEM2 =

Protein-coding gene in the species Homo sapiens

Identifiers
- Aliases: EDEM2, C20orf31, C20orf49, bA4204.1, ER degradation enhancing alpha-mannosidase like protein 2
- External IDs: OMIM: 610302; MGI: 1915540; GeneCards: EDEM2

Gene location (Human)
Chr.	Chromosome 20 (human)
Band	20q11.22	Start	35,115,364 bp
Band	20q11.22	End	35,147,336 bp

Gene location (Mouse)
Chr.	Chromosome 2 (mouse)
Band	2|2 H1	Start	155,543,597 bp
Band	2|2 H1	End	155,571,395 bp
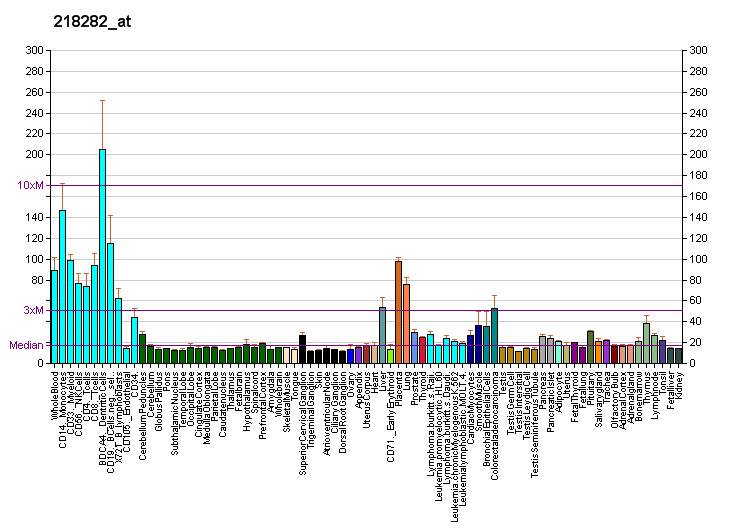
RNA expression pattern
Bgee	Human / Mouse (ortholog); Top expressed in: granulocyte; monocyte; right lobe of liver; islet of Langerhans; right adrenal gland; body of pancreas; left adrenal gland; mucosa of transverse colon; decidua; right adrenal cortex / Top expressed in: lacrimal gland; decidua; islet of Langerhans; salivary gland; parotid gland; crypt of lieberkuhn of small intestine; pyloric antrum; seminal vesicula; epithelium of stomach; submandibular gland; More reference expression data
BioGPS	More reference expression data
Gene ontology
Molecular function	calcium ion binding; mannosyl-oligosaccharide 1,2-alpha-mannosidase activity; catalytic activity
Cellular component	endoplasmic reticulum lumen; endoplasmic reticulum; membrane; endoplasmic reticulum quality control compartment
Biological process	endoplasmic reticulum unfolded protein response; mannose trimming involved in glycoprotein ERAD pathway; N-glycan processing; positive regulation of retrograde protein transport, ER to cytosol; response to unfolded protein; ubiquitin-dependent glycoprotein ERAD pathway; trimming of terminal mannose on B branch; trimming of terminal mannose on C branch; trimming of first mannose on A branch; trimming of second mannose on A branch
Sources:Amigo / QuickGO
Orthologs
Databases	NCBI: entry; OMA: entry
Species	Human	Mouse
Entrez	55741	108687
Ensembl	ENSG00000088298	ENSMUSG00000038312
UniProt	Q9BV94	Q8BJT9
RefSeq (mRNA)	NM_001145025; NM_018217	NM_145537
RefSeq (protein)	NP_001138497; NP_060687	NP_663512
Location (UCSC)	Chr 20: 35.12 – 35.15 Mb	Chr 2: 155.54 – 155.57 Mb
PubMed search
- Wikidata
View/Edit Human	View/Edit Mouse

ER degradation-enhancing alpha-mannosidase-like 2 is an enzyme that in humans is encoded by the EDEM2 gene.
