= UQCC =

Protein-coding gene in the species Homo sapiens

UQCC1

Identifiers
- Aliases: UQCC1, BFZB, C20orf44, CBP3, UQCC, ubiquinol-cytochrome c reductase complex assembly factor 1
- External IDs: OMIM: 611797; MGI: 1929472; HomoloGene: 14709; GeneCards: UQCC1; OMA:UQCC1 - orthologs

Gene location (Human)
Chr.	Chromosome 20 (human)
Band	20q11.22	Start	35,302,566 bp
Band	20q11.22	End	35,412,031 bp

Gene location (Mouse)
Chr.	Chromosome 2 (mouse)
Band	2|2 H1	Start	155,688,814 bp
Band	2|2 H1	End	155,772,230 bp
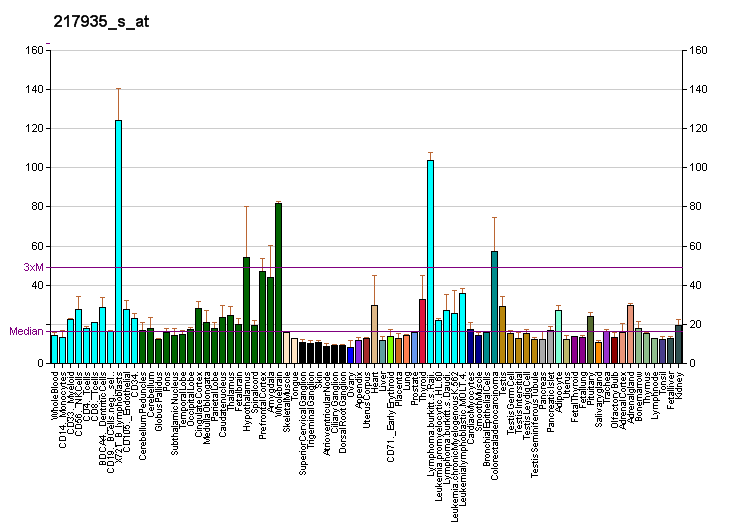
RNA expression pattern
Bgee	Human / Mouse (ortholog); Top expressed in: gastrocnemius muscle; muscle of thigh; apex of heart; left ventricle; right uterine tube; right auricle of heart; biceps brachii; right hemisphere of cerebellum; prefrontal cortex; Skeletal muscle tissue of biceps brachii / Top expressed in: muscle of thigh; interventricular septum; right ventricle; right kidney; digastric muscle; sternocleidomastoid muscle; temporal muscle; neural layer of retina; myocardium of ventricle; triceps brachii muscle; More reference expression data
BioGPS	More reference expression data
Gene ontology
Molecular function	protein binding
Cellular component	mitochondrial inner membrane; membrane; mitochondrion; cytoplasmic vesicle
Biological process	mitochondrial respiratory chain complex III assembly; positive regulation of mitochondrial translation
Sources:Amigo / QuickGO
Orthologs
Species	Human	Mouse
Entrez	55245	56046
Ensembl	ENSG00000101019	ENSMUSG00000005882
UniProt	Q9NVA1	Q9CWU6
RefSeq (mRNA)	NM_001184977; NM_018244; NM_199487; NM_199513	NM_018888; NM_001355441; NM_001355442; NM_001355443
RefSeq (protein)	NP_001171906; NP_060714; NP_955781	NP_061376; NP_001342370; NP_001342371; NP_001342372
Location (UCSC)	Chr 20: 35.3 – 35.41 Mb	Chr 2: 155.69 – 155.77 Mb
PubMed search
- Wikidata
View/Edit Human	View/Edit Mouse

Ubiquinol-cytochrome c reductase complex chaperone CBP3 homolog is an enzyme that in humans is encoded by the UQCC1 gene (previously UQCC).
