= Zinc finger protein 343 =

Protein found in humans

ZNF343

Identifiers
- Aliases: ZNF343, dJ734P14.5, zinc finger protein 343
- External IDs: GeneCards: ZNF343

Gene location (Human)
Chr.	Chromosome 20 (human)
Band	20p13	Start	2,481,817 bp
Band	20p13	End	2,524,702 bp
RNA expression pattern
Bgee	Human / Mouse (ortholog); Top expressed in: tibialis anterior muscle; secondary oocyte; Achilles tendon; gastric mucosa; popliteal artery; tibial arteries; gastrocnemius muscle; muscle layer of sigmoid colon; body of uterus; tibial nerve / n/a; More reference expression data
BioGPS	n/a
Gene ontology
Molecular function	DNA binding; protein binding; metal ion binding; nucleic acid binding; DNA-binding transcription factor activity, RNA polymerase II-specific
Cellular component	intracellular anatomical structure; nucleus
Biological process	regulation of transcription, DNA-templated; transcription, DNA-templated; regulation of transcription by RNA polymerase II
Sources:Amigo / QuickGO
Orthologs
Databases	NCBI: entry; OMA: entry
Species	Human	Mouse
Entrez	79175	n/a
Ensembl	ENSG00000088876	n/a
UniProt	Q6P1L6	n/a
RefSeq (mRNA)	NM_001282495; NM_001282496; NM_001282497; NM_001282498; NM_001282499 NM_024325; NM_001321800; NM_001321801; NM_001321802; NM_001321803; NM_001321805	n/a
RefSeq (protein)	NP_001269424; NP_001269425; NP_001269426; NP_001269427; NP_001269428 NP_001308729; NP_001308730; NP_001308731; NP_001308732; NP_001308734; NP_077301	n/a
Location (UCSC)	Chr 20: 2.48 – 2.52 Mb	n/a
PubMed search		n/a
- Wikidata
View/Edit Human

Zinc finger protein 343 is a protein that in humans is encoded by the ZNF343 gene.
