= Heat shock protein family A (Hsp70) member 12B =

Protein-coding gene in the species Homo sapiens

HSPA12B

Identifiers
- Aliases: HSPA12B, C20orf60, dJ1009E24.2, heat shock protein family A (Hsp70) member 12B
- External IDs: OMIM: 610702; MGI: 1919880; GeneCards: HSPA12B

Gene location (Human)
Chr.	Chromosome 20 (human)
Band	20p13	Start	3,732,685 bp
Band	20p13	End	3,753,111 bp

Gene location (Mouse)
Chr.	Chromosome 2 (mouse)
Band	2|2 F1	Start	130,969,200 bp
Band	2|2 F1	End	130,988,241 bp
RNA expression pattern
Bgee	Human / Mouse (ortholog); Top expressed in: tendon of biceps brachii; apex of heart; right lung; myocardium of left ventricle; subcutaneous adipose tissue; spleen; sperm; decidua; upper lobe of left lung; epithelium of lactiferous gland / Top expressed in: aortic valve; ascending aorta; external carotid artery; internal carotid artery; fossa; right lung lobe; yolk sac; muscle of thigh; condyle; endothelial cell of lymphatic vessel; More reference expression data
BioGPS	n/a
Orthologs
Databases	NCBI: entry; OMA: entry
Species	Human	Mouse
Entrez	116835	72630
Ensembl	ENSG00000132622	ENSMUSG00000074793
UniProt	Q96MM6	Q9CZJ2
RefSeq (mRNA)	NM_001197327; NM_052970; NM_001318322	NM_028306
RefSeq (protein)	NP_001184256; NP_001305251; NP_443202; NP_001184256.1	NP_082582
Location (UCSC)	Chr 20: 3.73 – 3.75 Mb	Chr 2: 130.97 – 130.99 Mb
PubMed search
- Wikidata
View/Edit Human	View/Edit Mouse

Heat shock protein family A (Hsp70) member 12B is a protein that in humans is encoded by the HSPA12B gene.

== Function ==
The protein encoded by this gene contains an atypical heat shock protein 70 (Hsp70) ATPase domain and is therefore a distant member of the mammalian Hsp70 family. This gene may be involved in susceptibility to atherosclerosis. Alternative splicing results in multiple transcript variants encoding different isoforms. [provided by RefSeq, Dec 2015].
