= ESF1 =

Protein-coding gene in the species Homo sapiens

Identifiers
- Aliases: ESF1, ABTAP, C20orf6, bA526K24.1, HDCMC28P, ESF1 nucleolar pre-rRNA processing protein homolog
- External IDs: MGI: 1913830; HomoloGene: 5717; GeneCards: ESF1; OMA:ESF1 - orthologs

Gene location (Human)
Chr.	Chromosome 20 (human)
Band	20p12.1	Start	13,714,322 bp
Band	20p12.1	End	13,784,919 bp

Gene location (Mouse)
Chr.	Chromosome 2 (mouse)
Band	2|2 F3	Start	139,961,803 bp
Band	2|2 F3	End	140,012,484 bp
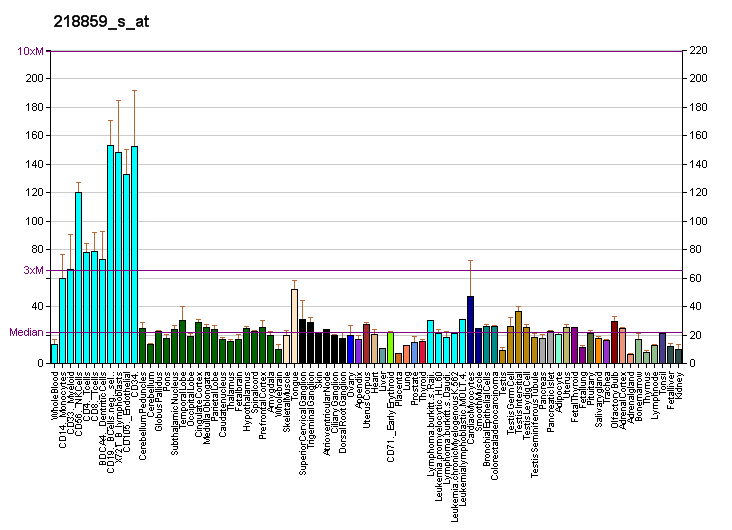
RNA expression pattern
Bgee	Human / Mouse (ortholog); Top expressed in: secondary oocyte; sperm; buccal mucosa cell; optic nerve; tendon of biceps brachii; internal globus pallidus; Achilles tendon; external globus pallidus; visceral pleura; sural nerve / Top expressed in: tail of embryo; maxillary prominence; mandibular prominence; Gonadal ridge; primitive streak; epiblast; migratory enteric neural crest cell; abdominal wall; vas deferens; somite; More reference expression data
BioGPS	More reference expression data
Gene ontology
Molecular function	RNA binding
Cellular component	nucleolus; nucleus; nucleoplasm; extracellular space
Biological process	regulation of transcription, DNA-templated; transcription, DNA-templated; rRNA processing
Sources:Amigo / QuickGO
Orthologs
Species	Human	Mouse
Entrez	51575	66580
Ensembl	ENSG00000089048	ENSMUSG00000045624
UniProt	Q9H501	Q3V1V3
RefSeq (mRNA)	NM_016649; NM_001276380	NM_001081090
RefSeq (protein)	NP_001263309; NP_057733	NP_001074559
Location (UCSC)	Chr 20: 13.71 – 13.78 Mb	Chr 2: 139.96 – 140.01 Mb
PubMed search
- Wikidata
View/Edit Human	View/Edit Mouse

ESF1 homolog is a protein that in humans is encoded by the ESF1 gene.
