= POLR3F =

Protein-coding gene in the species Homo sapiens

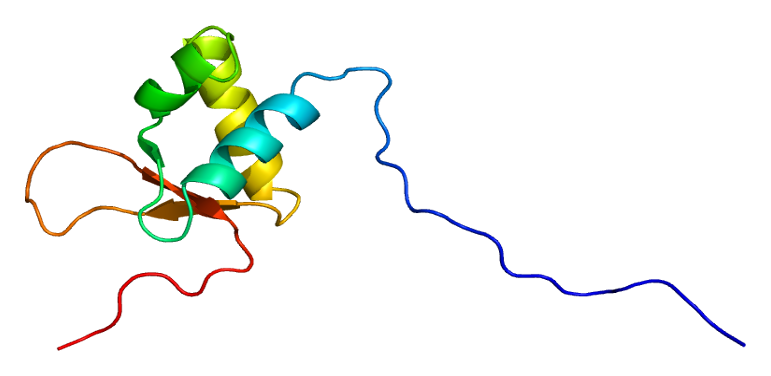

Identifiers
- Aliases: POLR3F, RPC39, RPC6, polymerase (RNA) III subunit F, RNA polymerase III subunit F, C34
- External IDs: OMIM: 617455; MGI: 1924086; GeneCards: POLR3F
Available structures
PDB	Ortholog search: PDBe RCSB
PDB	List of PDB id codes 2DK5, 2YU3

Gene location (Human)
Chr.	Chromosome 20 (human)
Band	20p11.23	Start	18,467,389 bp
Band	20p11.23	End	18,484,646 bp

Gene location (Mouse)
Chr.	Chromosome 2 (mouse)
Band	2|2 G1	Start	144,369,638 bp
Band	2|2 G1	End	144,383,915 bp
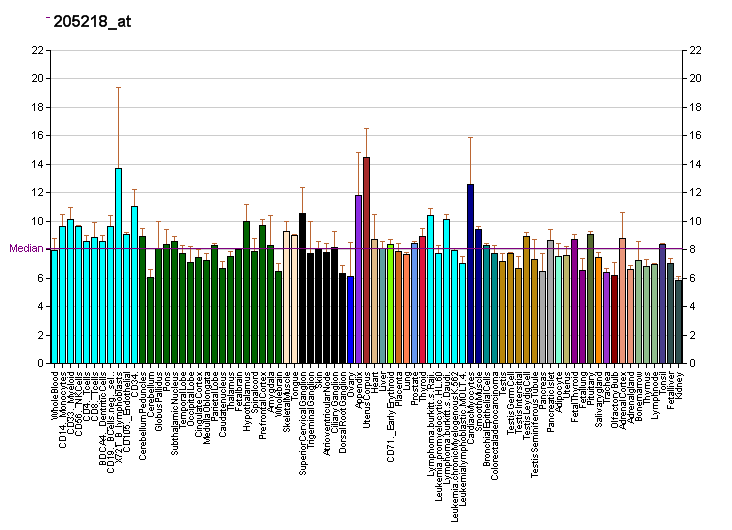
RNA expression pattern
Bgee	Human / Mouse (ortholog); Top expressed in: cerebellar hemisphere; right hemisphere of cerebellum; gonad; Achilles tendon; testicle; Brodmann area 9; ganglionic eminence; right frontal lobe; ventricular zone; monocyte / Top expressed in: saccule; ectoderm; otic vesicle; otic placode; Rostral migratory stream; human fetus; zygote; tail of embryo; genital tubercle; secondary oocyte; More reference expression data
BioGPS	More reference expression data
Gene ontology
Molecular function	DNA-directed 5'-3' RNA polymerase activity; protein binding; RNA polymerase III activity; double-stranded DNA binding; DNA binding
Cellular component	RNA polymerase III complex; cytosol; nucleus; nucleoplasm
Biological process	positive regulation of interferon-beta production; immune system process; defense response to virus; positive regulation of innate immune response; transcription by RNA polymerase III; innate immune response; regulation of transcription by RNA polymerase III; positive regulation of type I interferon production
Sources:Amigo / QuickGO
Orthologs
Databases	NCBI: entry; OMA: entry
Species	Human	Mouse
Entrez	10621	70408
Ensembl	ENSG00000132664	ENSMUSG00000027427
UniProt	Q9H1D9	Q921X6
RefSeq (mRNA)	NM_001282526; NM_006466	NM_029763; NM_027417
RefSeq (protein)	NP_001269455; NP_006457	NP_084039
Location (UCSC)	Chr 20: 18.47 – 18.48 Mb	Chr 2: 144.37 – 144.38 Mb
PubMed search
- Wikidata
View/Edit Human	View/Edit Mouse

DNA-directed RNA polymerase III subunit RPC6 is an enzyme that in humans is encoded by the POLR3F gene.

== Function ==
The protein encoded by this gene is one of more than a dozen subunits forming eukaryotic RNA polymerase III (RNA Pol III), which transcribes 5S ribosomal RNA and tRNA genes. This protein has been shown to bind both TFIIIB90 and TBP, two subunits of RNA polymerase III transcription initiation factor IIIB (TFIIIB). Unlike most of the other RNA Pol III subunits, the encoded protein is unique to this polymerase.
