= OTOR =

Protein-coding gene in the species Homo sapiens

Identifiers
- Aliases: OTOR, FDP, MIAL1, otoraplin
- External IDs: OMIM: 606067; MGI: 1888678; GeneCards: OTOR

Gene location (Human)
Chr.	Chromosome 20 (human)
Band	20p12.1	Start	16,748,358 bp
Band	20p12.1	End	16,770,062 bp

Gene location (Mouse)
Chr.	Chromosome 2 (mouse)
Band	2|2 G1	Start	142,920,393 bp
Band	2|2 G1	End	142,923,633 bp
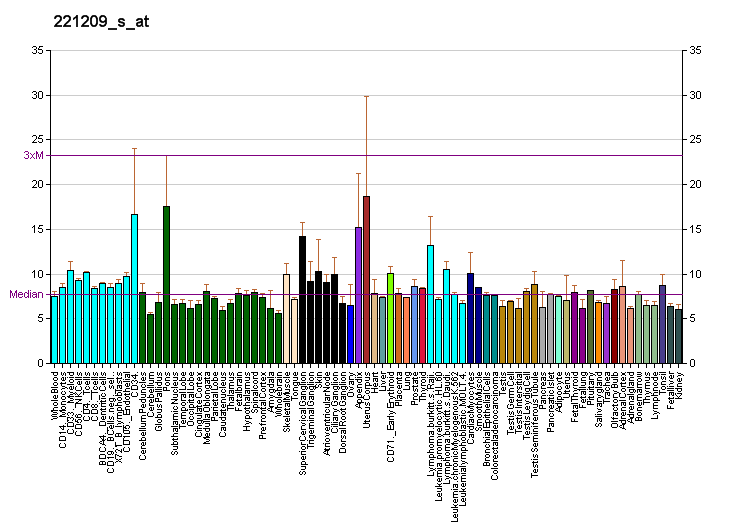
RNA expression pattern
Bgee	Human / Mouse (ortholog); Top expressed in: cochlea; gonad; Ventricular system of neuraxis; embryo; ventricular zone; renal cortex; ganglionic eminence; mesencephalon; liver; gallbladder / Top expressed in: vestibular sensory epithelium; utricle; fossa; intercostal muscle; stria vascularis; condyle; vestibular membrane of cochlear duct; trachea; cochlea; trigeminal ganglion; More reference expression data
BioGPS	More reference expression data
Orthologs
Databases	NCBI: entry; OMA: entry
Species	Human	Mouse
Entrez	56914	57329
Ensembl	ENSG00000125879	ENSMUSG00000027416
UniProt	Q9NRC9	Q9JIE3
RefSeq (mRNA)	NM_020157	NM_020595
RefSeq (protein)	NP_064542	NP_065620
Location (UCSC)	Chr 20: 16.75 – 16.77 Mb	Chr 2: 142.92 – 142.92 Mb
PubMed search
- Wikidata
View/Edit Human	View/Edit Mouse

Otoraplin is a protein that in humans is encoded by the OTOR gene.

The protein encoded by this gene is secreted via the Golgi apparatus and may function in cartilage development and maintenance. A frequent polymorphism in the translation start codon of this gene can abolish translation and may be associated with forms of deafness. This gene is a member of the melanoma-inhibiting activity gene family. In addition, alternate polyA sites exist for this gene.
