= Syntaphilin =

Protein-coding gene in the species Homo sapiens

SNPH

Identifiers
- Aliases: SNPH, bA314N13.5, syntaphilin
- External IDs: OMIM: 604942; MGI: 2139270; HomoloGene: 8817; GeneCards: SNPH; OMA:SNPH - orthologs

Gene location (Human)
Chr.	Chromosome 20 (human)
Band	20p13	Start	1,266,280 bp
Band	20p13	End	1,309,328 bp

Gene location (Mouse)
Chr.	Chromosome 2 (mouse)
Band	2|2 G3	Start	151,590,549 bp
Band	2|2 G3	End	151,632,593 bp
RNA expression pattern
Bgee	Human / Mouse (ortholog); Top expressed in: Region I of hippocampus proper; Brodmann area 46; postcentral gyrus; orbitofrontal cortex; entorhinal cortex; superior frontal gyrus; dorsal motor nucleus of vagus nerve; right frontal lobe; inferior olivary nucleus; cingulate gyrus / Top expressed in: visual cortex; primary visual cortex; superior frontal gyrus; dentate gyrus of hippocampal formation granule cell; subiculum; hippocampus proper; prefrontal cortex; cingulate gyrus; olfactory tubercle; primary motor cortex; More reference expression data
BioGPS	n/a
Gene ontology
Molecular function	syntaxin-1 binding
Cellular component	cytoplasm; integral component of membrane; neuron projection; cytoplasmic microtubule; cell junction; soma; plasma membrane; synapse; presynaptic membrane; mitochondrial membranes; membrane
Biological process	brain development; synaptic vesicle docking; neurotransmitter secretion; neuron differentiation
Sources:Amigo / QuickGO
Orthologs
Species	Human	Mouse
Entrez	9751	241727
Ensembl	ENSG00000101298	ENSMUSG00000027457
UniProt	O15079	Q80U23
RefSeq (mRNA)	NM_014723; NM_001318234	NM_001291076; NM_001291077; NM_198214
RefSeq (protein)	NP_001305163; NP_055538	NP_001278005; NP_001278006; NP_937857
Location (UCSC)	Chr 20: 1.27 – 1.31 Mb	Chr 2: 151.59 – 151.63 Mb
PubMed search
- Wikidata
View/Edit Human	View/Edit Mouse

Syntaphilin is a protein that in humans is encoded by the SNPH gene.

== Function ==
Syntaxin-1, synaptobrevin/VAMP, and SNAP25 interact to form the SNARE complex, which is required for synaptic vesicle docking and fusion. The protein encoded by this gene is membrane-associated and inhibits SNARE complex formation by binding free syntaxin-1. Expression of this gene appears to be brain-specific. Alternative splicing results in multiple transcript variants encoding different isoforms.
