= GDNF-inducible zinc finger protein 1 =

Protein-coding gene in the species Homo sapiens

GZF1

Identifiers
- Aliases: GZF1, ZBTB23, ZNF336, GDNF inducible zinc finger protein 1, JLSM
- External IDs: OMIM: 613842; MGI: 1921783; GeneCards: GZF1

Gene location (Human)
Chr.	Chromosome 20 (human)
Band	20p11.21	Start	23,362,182 bp
Band	20p11.21	End	23,373,062 bp

Gene location (Mouse)
Chr.	Chromosome 2 (mouse)
Band	2|2 G3	Start	148,522,943 bp
Band	2|2 G3	End	148,534,869 bp
RNA expression pattern
Bgee	Human / Mouse (ortholog); Top expressed in: sperm; myocardium of left ventricle; endothelial cell; pancreatic epithelial cell; middle temporal gyrus; cardiac muscle tissue of right atrium; Brodmann area 23; tibialis anterior muscle; deltoid muscle; right ventricle / Top expressed in: zygote; hand; secondary oocyte; otolith organ; utricle; left lobe of liver; primary oocyte; genital tubercle; habenula; muscle of thigh; More reference expression data
BioGPS	n/a
Gene ontology
Molecular function	RNA polymerase II cis-regulatory region sequence-specific DNA binding; sequence-specific DNA binding; DNA binding; DNA-binding transcription repressor activity, RNA polymerase II-specific; metal ion binding; nucleic acid binding; DNA-binding transcription factor activity, RNA polymerase II-specific
Cellular component	nucleolus; nucleus; nucleoplasm; cytoplasm
Biological process	branching involved in ureteric bud morphogenesis; negative regulation of transcription, DNA-templated; regulation of transcription, DNA-templated; negative regulation of transcription by RNA polymerase II; transcription, DNA-templated
Sources:Amigo / QuickGO
Orthologs
Databases	NCBI: entry; OMA: entry
Species	Human	Mouse
Entrez	64412	74533
Ensembl	ENSG00000125812	ENSMUSG00000027439
UniProt	Q9H116	Q4VBD9
RefSeq (mRNA)	NM_022482; NM_001317012; NM_001317019	NM_028986; NM_001355689
RefSeq (protein)	NP_001303941; NP_001303948; NP_071927	NP_083262; NP_001342618
Location (UCSC)	Chr 20: 23.36 – 23.37 Mb	Chr 2: 148.52 – 148.53 Mb
PubMed search
- Wikidata
View/Edit Human	View/Edit Mouse

GDNF-inducible zinc finger protein 1 is a protein in humans that is encoded by the GZF1 gene.
