= R3HDML =

Protein-coding gene in the species Homo sapiens

Identifiers
- Aliases: R3HDML, dJ881L22.3, R3H domain containing like
- External IDs: MGI: 3650937; HomoloGene: 45608; GeneCards: R3HDML; OMA:R3HDML - orthologs

Gene location (Human)
Chr.	Chromosome 20 (human)
Band	20q13.12	Start	44,337,043 bp
Band	20q13.12	End	44,351,238 bp

Gene location (Mouse)
Chr.	Chromosome 2 (mouse)
Band	2|2 H3	Start	163,334,238 bp
Band	2|2 H3	End	163,344,532 bp
RNA expression pattern
Bgee	Human / Mouse (ortholog); Top expressed in: testicle; mucosa of transverse colon; right uterine tube; rectum; duodenum; right lobe of liver; human kidney; canal of the cervix; renal cortex; hypothalamus / Top expressed in: lens; blastocyst; primary oocyte; embryo; secondary oocyte; embryo; zygote; proximal tubule; human kidney; right kidney; More reference expression data
BioGPS	n/a
Gene ontology
Molecular function	peptidase inhibitor activity
Cellular component	extracellular region; extracellular space
Biological process	negative regulation of peptidase activity
Sources:Amigo / QuickGO
Orthologs
Species	Human	Mouse
Entrez	140902	100043899
Ensembl	ENSG00000101074	ENSMUSG00000078949
UniProt	Q9H3Y0	A2A5I3
RefSeq (mRNA)	NM_178491	NM_001099331
RefSeq (protein)	NP_848586	NP_001092801
Location (UCSC)	Chr 20: 44.34 – 44.35 Mb	Chr 2: 163.33 – 163.34 Mb
PubMed search
- Wikidata
View/Edit Human	View/Edit Mouse

R3H domain containing-like is a protein in humans that is encoded by the R3HDML gene.
