= SPATA2 =

Protein-coding gene in humans

Identifiers
- Aliases: SPATA2, PD1, PPP1R145, tamo, spermatogenesis associated 2
- External IDs: OMIM: 607662; MGI: 2146885; GeneCards: SPATA2

Gene location (Human)
Chr.	Chromosome 20 (human)
Band	20q13.13	Start	49,903,391 bp
Band	20q13.13	End	49,915,529 bp

Gene location (Mouse)
Chr.	Chromosome 2 (mouse)
Band	2|2 H3	Start	167,323,053 bp
Band	2|2 H3	End	167,334,807 bp
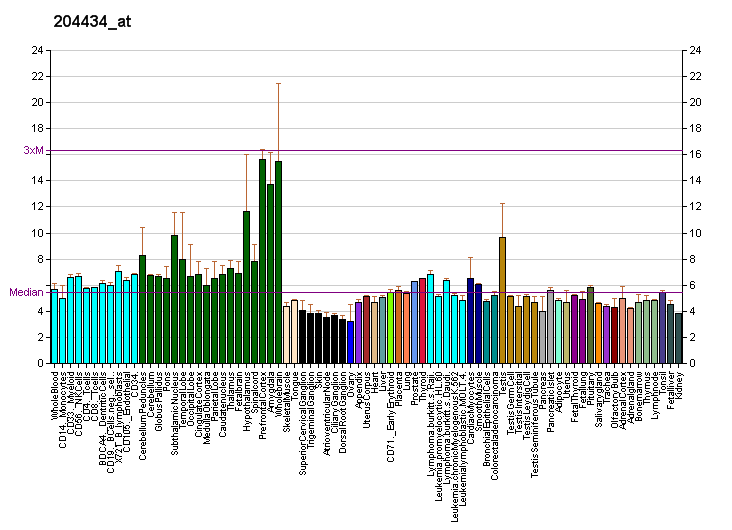

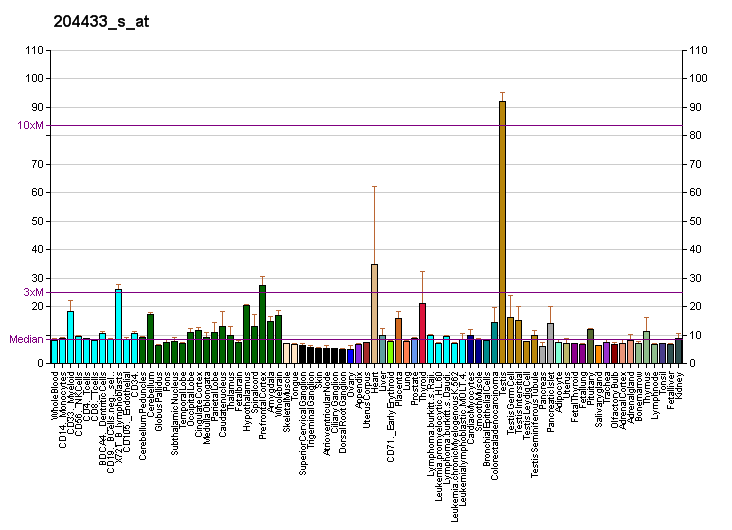
RNA expression pattern
Bgee	Human / Mouse (ortholog); Top expressed in: secondary oocyte; middle temporal gyrus; endothelial cell; Brodmann area 23; primary visual cortex; right frontal lobe; prefrontal cortex; Brodmann area 9; C1 segment; caudate nucleus / Top expressed in: otic vesicle; lobe of cerebellum; zygote; cerebellar vermis; dentate gyrus of hippocampal formation granule cell; subiculum; visual cortex; primary motor cortex; primary visual cortex; hippocampus proper; More reference expression data
BioGPS	More reference expression data
Gene ontology
Molecular function	protein binding; molecular function
Cellular component	cytoplasm; nucleus; fibrillar center
Biological process	multicellular organism development; cell differentiation; spermatogenesis; regulation of tumor necrosis factor-mediated signaling pathway; regulation of inflammatory response; regulation of necroptotic process; protein K63-linked deubiquitination; protein linear deubiquitination; programmed cell death
Sources:Amigo / QuickGO
Orthologs
Databases	NCBI: entry; OMA: entry
Species	Human	Mouse
Entrez	9825	263876
Ensembl	ENSG00000158480	ENSMUSG00000047030
UniProt	Q9UM82	Q8K004
RefSeq (mRNA)	NM_001135773; NM_006038	NM_170756; NM_001356523
RefSeq (protein)	NP_001129245; NP_006029	NP_001343452; NP_739562
Location (UCSC)	Chr 20: 49.9 – 49.92 Mb	Chr 2: 167.32 – 167.33 Mb
PubMed search
- Wikidata
View/Edit Human	View/Edit Mouse

Spermatogenesis-associated protein 2 is a protein that in humans is encoded by the SPATA2 gene.
