= M62812 =

Chemical compound

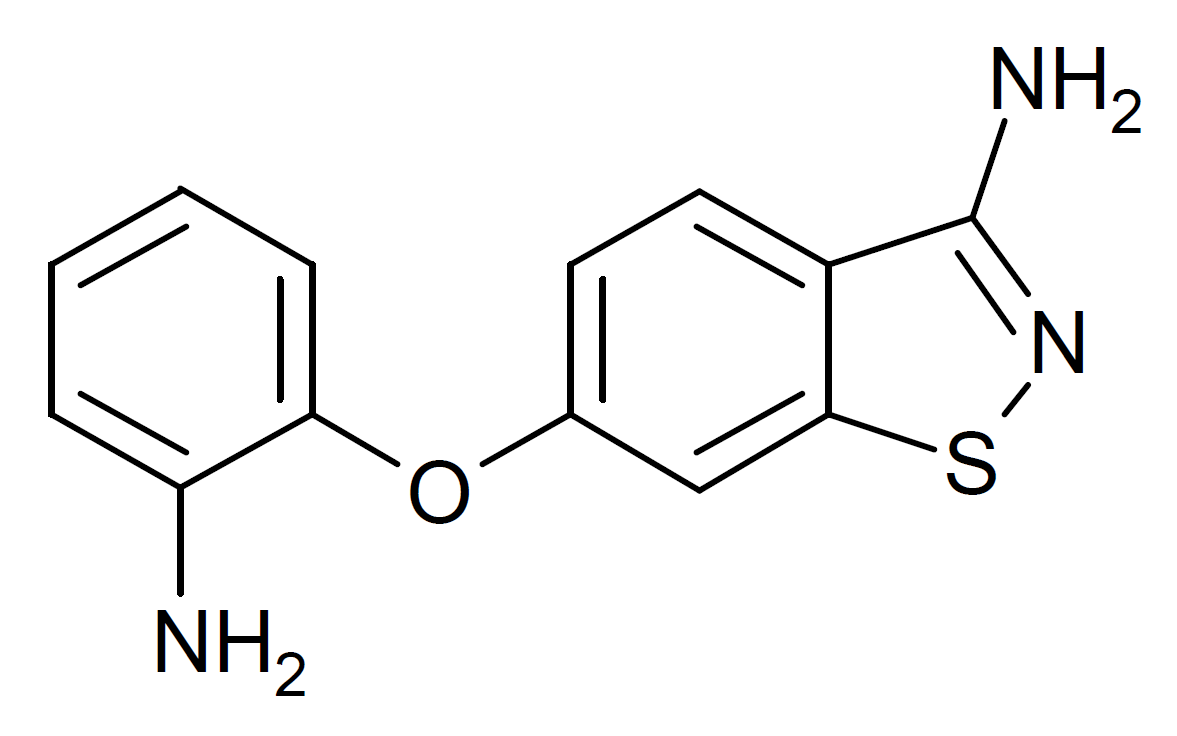

Identifiers
- IUPAC name: 6-(2-aminophenoxy)-1,2-benzothiazol-3-amine
- CAS Number: 613262-61-6
- PubChem CID: 44224215
- ChemSpider: 24691458
- UNII: D98NBX7QJ5
- ChEMBL: ChEMBL458612
- CompTox Dashboard (EPA): DTXSID701336699

Chemical and physical data
- Formula: C_{13}H_{11}N_{3}OS
- Molar mass: 257.31 g·mol^{−1}
- 3D model (JSmol): Interactive image
- SMILES: C1=CC=C(C(=C1)N)OC2=CC3=C(C=C2)C(=NS3)N
- InChI: InChI=1S/C13H11N3OS/c14-10-3-1-2-4-11(10)17-8-5-6-9-12(7-8)18-16-13(9)15/h1-7H,14H2,(H2,15,16); Key:HQCTTYOADNAJJR-UHFFFAOYSA-N

M62812 is a drug which acts as a potent and selective antagonist of toll-like receptor 4 (TLR4). In animal studies it blocks TLR4-mediated cytokine release and has antiinflammatory effects, showing efficacy in animal models of arthritis and septic shock.

== See also ==
- TLR4-IN-C34
- Resatorvid
- VGX-1027
