= (+)-Morphine =

Chemical compound

Identifiers
- IUPAC name: (4S,4aS,7R,7aS,12bR)-3-methyl-2,4,4a,7,7a,13-hexahydro-1H-4,12-methanobenzofuro[3,2-e]isoquinoline-7,9-diol
- CAS Number: 65165-99-3
- PubChem CID: 5479215
- ChemSpider: 4586177

Chemical and physical data
- Formula: C_{17}H_{19}NO_{3}
- Molar mass: 285.343 g·mol^{−1}
- 3D model (JSmol): Interactive image
- SMILES: CN1CC[C@@]23[C@H]4[C@@H]1CC5=C2C(=C(C=C5)O)O[C@@H]3[C@@H](C=C4)O
- InChI: InChI=1S/C17H19NO3/c1-18-7-6-17-10-3-5-13(20)16(17)21-15-12(19)4-2-9(14(15)17)8-11(10)18/h2-5,10-11,13,16,19-20H,6-8H2,1H3/t10-,11+,13-,16-,17-/m1/s1; Key:BQJCRHHNABKAKU-QHQPWPDESA-N

(+)-Morphine also known as dextro-morphine is the "unnatural" enantiomer of the opioid drug (−)-morphine. Unlike "natural" levo-morphine, unnatural dextro-morphine is not present in Papaver somniferum and is the product of laboratory synthesis.

In contrast to natural morphine, the unnatural enantiomer has no affinity or efficacy for the mu opioid receptor and therefore has no analgesic effects. To the contrary, in rats, (+)-morphine acts as an antianalgesic and is approximately 71,000 times more potent as an antianalgesic than (−)-morphine is as an analgesic. (+)-Morphine derives its antianalgesic effects by being a selective-agonist of the Toll-like receptor 4 (TLR4) which, alongside (+)-morphine not activating the opioid receptors, allows it to effectively reverse the analgesic properties of (−)-morphine. TLR4 is involved in immune system responses, and activation of TLR4 induces glial activation and release of inflammatory mediators such as TNF-α and Interleukin-1.

== See also ==
- (+)-Naloxone
- Dextromethorphan
