= TLR4 interactor with leucine rich repeats =

Protein-coding gene in the species Homo sapiens

TRIL

Identifiers
- Aliases: TRIL, KIAA0644, TLR4 interactor with leucine rich repeats
- External IDs: OMIM: 613356; MGI: 1914123; HomoloGene: 69404; GeneCards: TRIL; OMA:TRIL - orthologs

Gene location (Human)
Chr.	Chromosome 7 (human)
Band	7p14.3	Start	28,953,358 bp
Band	7p14.3	End	28,958,330 bp

Gene location (Mouse)
Chr.	Chromosome 6 (mouse)
Band	6|6 B3	Start	53,792,453 bp
Band	6|6 B3	End	53,797,815 bp
RNA expression pattern
Bgee	Human / Mouse (ortholog); Top expressed in: internal globus pallidus; external globus pallidus; dorsal motor nucleus of vagus nerve; pars compacta; pars reticulata; caudate nucleus; putamen; Region I of hippocampus proper; amygdala; nucleus accumbens / Top expressed in: Gonadal ridge; vestibular sensory epithelium; utricle; vas deferens; renal corpuscle; medullary collecting duct; lumbar subsegment of spinal cord; maxillary prominence; limb bud; mandibular prominence; More reference expression data
BioGPS	n/a
Gene ontology
Molecular function	lipopolysaccharide binding
Cellular component	integral component of membrane; lipopolysaccharide receptor complex; membrane; extracellular space; extracellular matrix
Biological process	regulation of cytokine production involved in immune response; innate immune response; inflammatory response; toll-like receptor 4 signaling pathway; immune system process
Sources:Amigo / QuickGO
Orthologs
Species	Human	Mouse
Entrez	9865	66873
Ensembl	ENSG00000255690	ENSMUSG00000043496
UniProt	Q7L0X0	Q9DBY4
RefSeq (mRNA)	NM_014817	NM_025817
RefSeq (protein)	NP_055632	NP_080093
Location (UCSC)	Chr 7: 28.95 – 28.96 Mb	Chr 6: 53.79 – 53.8 Mb
PubMed search
- Wikidata
View/Edit Human	View/Edit Mouse

TLR4 interactor with leucine rich repeats, also known as KIAA0644, is a protein that in humans is encoded by the TRIL gene.

== Function ==
The exact function of KIAA0644 is not known. It is, however, a member of the leucine-rich repeat family of proteins, which are known to be involved in protein-protein interactions. This protein is known to interact with the TLR4 protein.

TRIL is a component of the TLR4 complex and is induced in a number of cell types by lipopolysaccharide (LPS).

== Protein sequence ==
The main isoform of the human protein is 811 amino long and is composed primarily of leucine (17%), alanine and arginine (~10%), and glycine (~ 8.5%) residues. The protein sequence is predicted to consists mostly of α-helices and a few β-sheet

== Homology ==
KIAA0644 is conserved well among mammals but can be found in all chordates with lower sequence identities.

== Gene neighborhood ==
The KIAA0644 gene is neighbors to mRNA-cAMP responsive element binding gene downstream and mRNA carboxypeptidase and serine carboxypeptidase gene upstream
