= Naloxone =

Opioid receptor antagonist

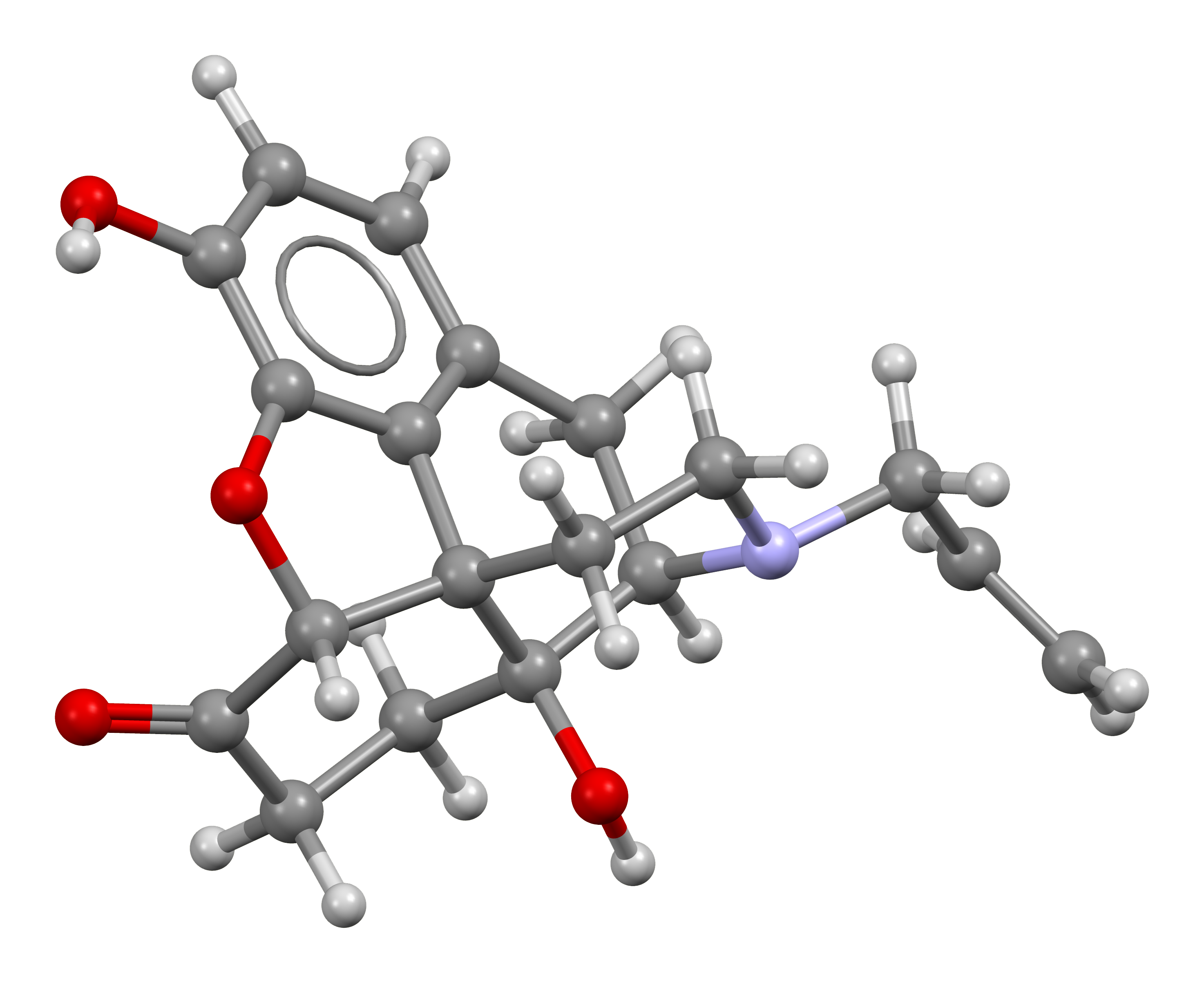

Clinical data
- Trade names: Narcan, others
- Other names: EN-1530; N-Allylnoroxymorphone; 17-Allyl-4,5α-epoxy-3,14-dihydroxymorphinan-6-one, naloxone hydrochloride (USAN US)
- AHFS/Drugs.com: Monograph
- MedlinePlus: a612022
- License data: US DailyMed: Naloxone
- Pregnancy category: AU: B1; US: C
- Routes of administration: Intranasal, intravenous, intramuscular
- Drug class: Opioid antagonist
- ATC code: A06AH04 (WHO) V03AB15 (WHO)

Legal status
- Legal status: AU: S4 (Prescription only) / S3 (Pharmacist Only Medicine); BR: Class C1 (Other controlled substances); CA: OTC; DE: § 48 AMG/§ 1 MPAV (Prescription only); UK: POM (Prescription only); US: OTC / Rx-only; In general: ℞ (Prescription only)

Pharmacokinetic data
- Bioavailability: 2% (by mouth, 90% absorption but high first-pass metabolism); 43–54% (intranasal); 98% (intramuscular, subcutaneous)
- Metabolism: Liver
- Onset of action: IN: 3-7 min IV: 2 min, IM: 5 min
- Elimination half-life: 1–1.5 h
- Duration of action: IN: 30–90 min IV: 45 min IM: 30–120 min
- Excretion: Urine, bile

Identifiers
- IUPAC name: (4R,4aS,7aR,12bS)-4a,9-dihydroxy-3-(prop-2-en-1-yl)-2,3,4,4a,5,6-hexahydro-1H-4,12-methano[1]benzofurano[3,2-e]isoquinolin-7(7aH)-one
- CAS Number: 465-65-6
- PubChem CID: 5284596
- IUPHAR/BPS: 1638
- DrugBank: DB01183
- ChemSpider: 4447644
- UNII: 36B82AMQ7N
- KEGG: D08249; as HCl: D01340
- ChEBI: CHEBI:7459
- ChEMBL: ChEMBL80
- CompTox Dashboard (EPA): DTXSID8023349
- ECHA InfoCard: 100.006.697

Chemical and physical data
- Formula: C_{19}H_{21}NO_{4}
- Molar mass: 327.380 g·mol^{−1}
- 3D model (JSmol): Interactive image
- SMILES: O=C1[C@@H]2OC3=C(O)C=CC4=C3[C@@]2([C@]5(CC1)O)CCN(CC=C)[C@@H]5C4
- InChI: InChI=1S/C19H21NO4/c1-2-8-20-9-7-18-15-11-3-4-12(21)16(15)24-17(18)13(22)5-6-19(18,23)14(20)10-11/h2-4,14,17,21,23H,1,5-10H2/t14-,17+,18+,19-/m1/s1; Key:UZHSEJADLWPNLE-GRGSLBFTSA-N

Naloxone, sold under the brand name Narcan among others, is an opioid antagonist, a medication used to reverse or reduce the effects of opioids. Naloxone is commonly used to restore breathing after an opioid overdose. Effects begin within two minutes when given intravenously, five minutes when injected into a muscle, and ten minutes as a nasal spray. Naloxone has also been said to have an onset of action of 3–7 minutes as an intranasal. Naloxone blocks the effects of opioids for 30 to 90 minutes.

Administration to opioid-dependent individuals may cause symptoms of opioid withdrawal, including restlessness, agitation, nausea, vomiting, a fast heart rate, and sweating. To prevent this, small doses every few minutes can be given until the desired effect is reached. In those with previous heart disease or taking medications that negatively affect the heart, further heart problems have occurred. There is limited data on naloxone's safety during pregnancy. Naloxone is a non-selective and competitive opioid receptor antagonist. It reverses the depression of the central nervous system and respiratory system caused by opioids.

Naloxone was patented in 1961 and approved for opioid overdose in the United States in 1971. It is on the World Health Organization's List of Essential Medicines. Naloxone is available as an over-the-counter medication.

== Medical uses ==
=== Opioid overdose ===
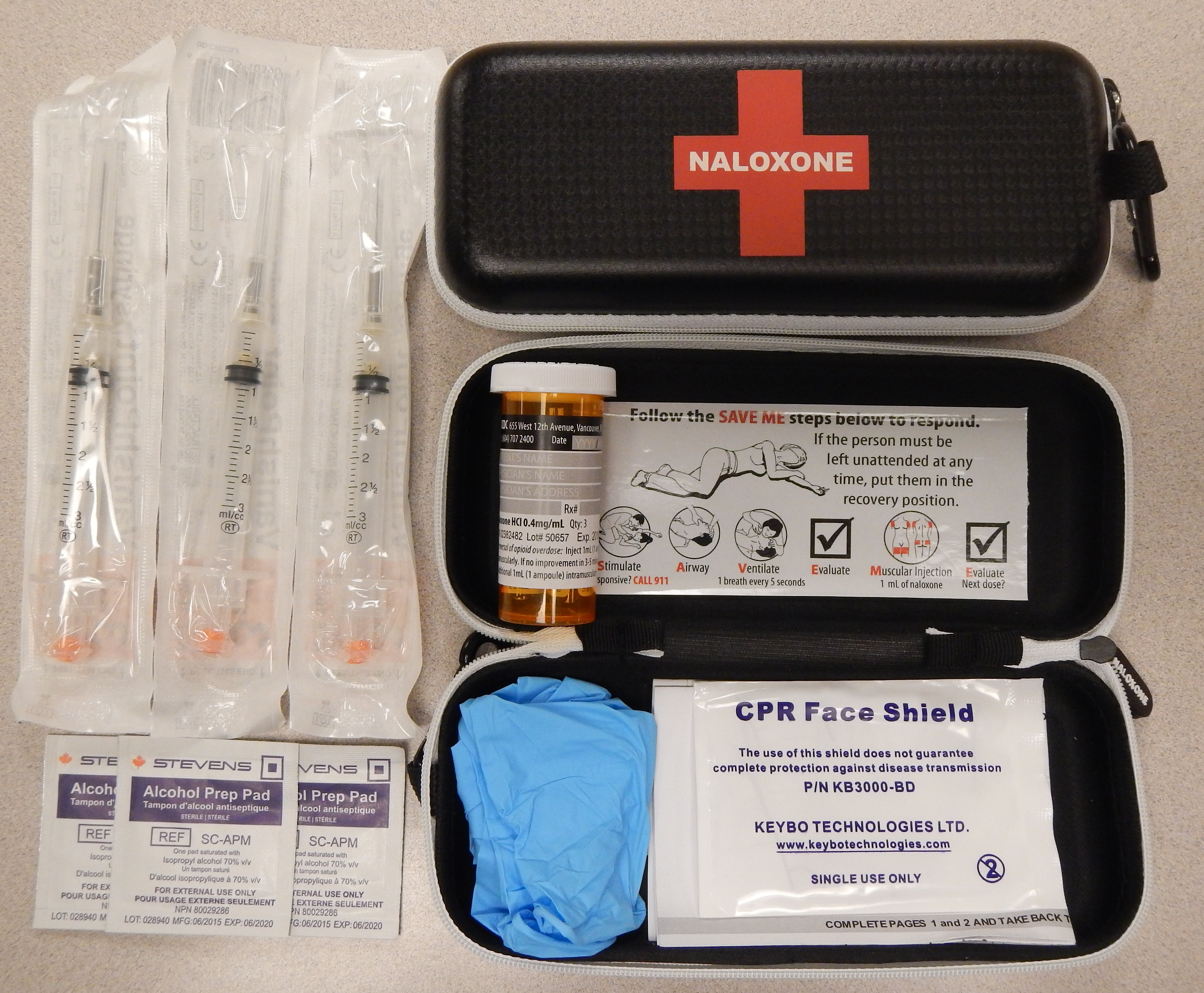
A naloxone kit as distributed in British Columbia, Canada, containing the medicine itself as well as the equipment required to administer it, including hypodermic needles and syringes, alcohol wipes (for sterilising the injection site) and a face shield.

Naloxone is useful in treating both acute opioid overdose and respiratory or mental depression due to opioids. Whether it is useful in those in cardiac arrest due to an opioid overdose is unclear.

It is included as a part of emergency overdose response kits distributed to heroin, fentanyl, and other opioid drug users, and to emergency responders. This has been shown to reduce rates of deaths due to overdose. A prescription for naloxone is recommended if a person is on a high dose of opioid (>100 mg of morphine equivalence/day), is prescribed any dose of opioid accompanied by a benzodiazepine, or is suspected or known to use opioids nonmedically. Prescribing naloxone should be accompanied by standard education that includes preventing, identifying, and responding to an overdose; rescue breathing; and calling emergency services.

Distribution of naloxone to individuals likely to encounter people who overdose is one aspect of harm reduction strategies.

However, with opioids that have longer half-lives, respiratory depression returns after naloxone has worn off; therefore, adequate dosing and continuous monitoring may be necessary.

=== Clonidine overdose ===
Naloxone can also be used as an antidote in an overdose of clonidine, a medication that lowers blood pressure. Clonidine overdoses are of special relevance for children, in whom even small doses can cause significant harm. However, there is controversy regarding naloxone's efficacy in treating the symptoms of clonidine overdose, namely slow heart rate, low blood pressure, and confusion/somnolence. Case reports that used doses of 0.1 mg/kg (maximum of 2 mg/dose) repeated every 1–2 minutes (10 mg total dose) have shown inconsistent benefit. As the doses used throughout the literature vary, it is difficult to form a conclusion regarding the benefit of naloxone in this setting. The mechanism for naloxone's proposed benefit in clonidine overdose is unclear. Still, it has been suggested that endogenous opioid receptors mediate the sympathetic nervous system in the brain and elsewhere in the body.

=== Preventing recreational opioid use ===
Naloxone is poorly absorbed when taken orally or sublingually, so it is often added to oral or sublingual opioid preparations, including buprenorphine and pentazocine, so that when swallowed or taken sublingually, only the non-naloxone opioid has an effect. However, if the combination is injected (such as by dissolving a pill or sublingual strip in water), the naloxone is believed to block the effect of the other opioid. This combination is used to prevent non-medical use.

However, SAMHSA's clinical guidelines state that if the combination of buprenorphine and naloxone is injected by a regular user of buprenorphine or buprenorphine/naloxone, then the buprenorphine would still produce an agonist effect but the naloxone would fail to produce an antagonist effect. This is because the amount of naloxone that would be required to block the buprenorphine after injection is much larger than the amount that is contained in buprenorphine/naloxone (Suboxone) pills and strips. If someone who is not physically dependent on opioids were to inject the buprenorphine/naloxone combination, then the effects of the buprenorphine may at most be slightly lessened, but the individual would still be expected to experience euphoric effects.

=== Other uses ===
A 2003 meta-analysis of existing research showed naloxone to improve blood flow in patients with shock, including septic, cardiogenic, hemorrhagic, or spinal shock, but could not determine if this reduced patient deaths.

Oral naloxone has been used for opioid-induced constipation (OIC). A 2018 meta-analysis cites 5 studies that tests it for this purpose. It found that medical treatment for OIC can be more efficacious than placebo, but did not look into the effect of individual treatments such as naloxone. As a result, no conclusion can be drawn from the study on naloxone's effectiveness for OIC.

Naloxone and other opioid antagonists have been examined as possible treatments for dissociative disorders. This use predicates on the theory that dissociative disorders cause disregulation in the body's natural opioid pathways. A 2023 meta-analytic study found some evidence of opioid antagonists being effective against dissociative disorders, but possible publication bias and differences in testing criteria encourages additional research.

=== Special populations ===
==== Pregnancy and breastfeeding ====
There are no adequate and well-controlled studies of the naloxone's use in pregnant women, much of the information on naloxone in pregnancy comes from studies on the use of naloxone and buprenorphine together, rather than the study of naloxone on its own. Although one study showed a possible link to preterm labor and low birth weight, but once again this study was done on women with opioid use disorder who were taking Suboxone, no studies have been done to see if treatment with naloxone for an opioid overdose can increase the chance of pregnancy-related problems.

Naloxone is able to cross the placental barrier and may precipitate neonatal withdrawal, as such it is important for women taking opioids during pregnancy to inform their baby's healthcare providers so that they can check for symptoms of withdrawal, especially if they are taking medications for OUD.

Small amounts of naloxone are excreted in breast milk, however, as naloxone is poorly absorbed orally it is not orally bioavailable and therefore is unlikely to affect a breastfeeding infant.

==== Children ====
Naloxone can be used on infants who were exposed to intrauterine opiates administered to mothers during delivery. However, there is insufficient evidence for the use of naloxone to lower cardiorespiratory and neurological depression in these infants. Infants exposed to high concentrations of opiates during pregnancy may have CNS damage in the setting of perinatal asphyxia. Naloxone has been studied to improve outcomes in this population, however the evidence is currently weak.

Intravenous, intramuscular, or subcutaneous administration of naloxone can be given to children and neonates to reverse opiate effects. The American Academy of Pediatrics recommends only intravenous administration as the other two forms can cause unpredictable absorption. After a dose is given, the child should be monitored for at least 24 hours. For children with low blood pressure due to septic shock, naloxone safety and effectiveness are not established.

==== Geriatric use ====
For patients 65 years and older, it is unclear if there is a difference in response. However, older people often have decreased liver and kidney function which may lead to an increased level of naloxone in their body.

=== Available forms ===
==== Intravenous ====
In hospital settings, naloxone is injected intravenously, with an onset of 1–2 minutes and a duration of up to 45 minutes.

==== Intramuscular or subcutaneous ====
Naloxone can also be administered via intramuscular or subcutaneous injection. The onset of naloxone provided through this route is 2 to 5 minutes with a duration of around 30–120min. Naloxone administered intramuscularly are provided through pre-filled syringes, vials, and auto-injector. A hand-held auto-injector is pocket-sized and can be used in non-medical settings such as in the home. It is designed for use by laypersons, including family members and caregivers of opioid users at risk for an opioid emergency, such as an overdose. According to the FDA's National Drug Code Directory, a generic version of the auto-injector began to be marketed at the end of 2019.

==== Intranasal ====
The intranasal route for naloxone was studied as early as 2001 by Paramedics in Denver, Colorado to test the route's feasibility as an alternative to IV administration. In a small sample size over the course of one month, 91% of patients who responded to naloxone by any route responded to IN naloxone without additional IV naloxone being administered. Narcan nasal spray was approved in the US in 2015 and is the first FDA-approved nasal spray for emergency treatment of suspected overdose. It was developed in a partnership between LightLake Therapeutics and the National Institute on Drug Abuse. The approval process was fast-tracked. A generic version of the nasal spray was approved in the United States in 2019, though did not come to market until 2021.

In 2021, the FDA approved Kloxxado, an 8 mg dose of intranasal naloxone developed by Hikma Pharmaceuticals. Citing the frequent need for multiple 4 mg doses of Narcan to successfully reverse overdose, packs of Kloxxado Nasal Spray contain two pre-packaged nasal spray devices, each containing 8 mg of naloxone.

However, a wedge device (nasal atomizer) can also be attached to a syringe that may also be used to create a mist to deliver the drug to the nasal mucosa. This is useful near facilities where many overdoses occur that already stock injectors.

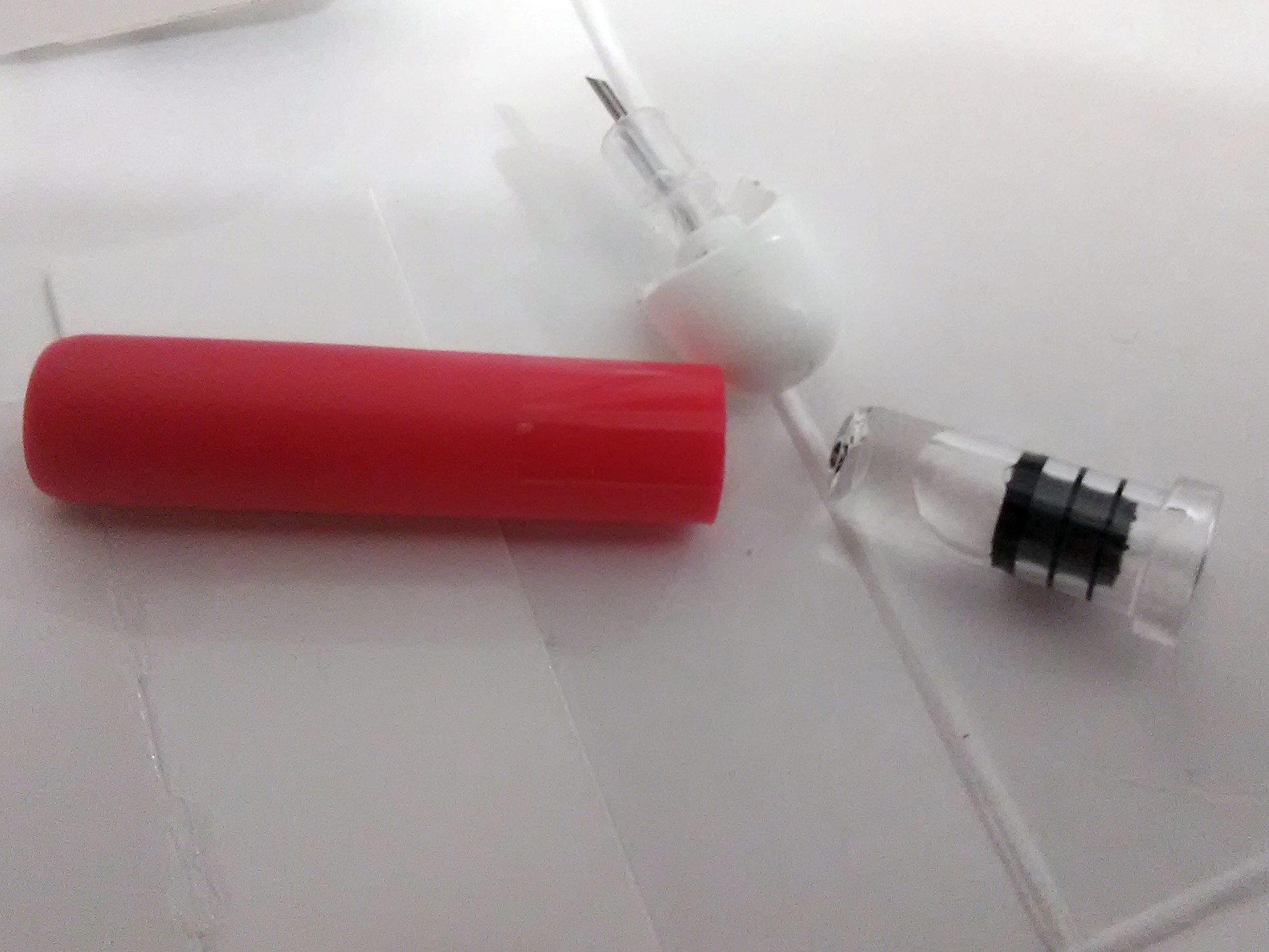
Internal components of a naloxone nasal spray

== Side effects ==
Administration of naloxone to somebody who has used opioids may cause rapid-onset opioid withdrawal.

Naloxone has little to no effect if opioids are not present. In people with opioids in their system, it may cause increased sweating, nausea, restlessness, trembling, vomiting, flushing, and headache, and has in rare cases been associated with heart rhythm changes, seizures, and pulmonary edema.

Naloxone has been shown to block the action of pain-lowering endorphins the body produces naturally. These endorphins likely operate on the same opioid receptors that naloxone blocks. It is capable of blocking a placebo pain-lowering response if the placebo is administered together with a hidden or blind injection of naloxone. Other studies have found that placebo alone can activate the body's μ-opioid endorphin system, delivering pain relief by the same receptor mechanism as morphine.

Naloxone should be used with caution in people with cardiovascular disease as well as those who are currently taking medications that could have adverse effects on the cardiovascular system such as causing low blood pressure, fluid accumulation in the lungs (pulmonary edema), and abnormal heart rhythms. There have been reports of abrupt reversals with opioid antagonists leading to pulmonary edema and ventricular fibrillation.

Use of naloxone to treat people who have been using opioids recreationally may cause acute opioid withdrawal with distressing physiological symptoms such as shivering, tachycardia, and nausea; these in turn may lead to aggression and reluctance to receive further treatment.

== Pharmacology ==
=== Pharmacodynamics ===
Naloxone at opioid receptors
Compound	Affinities (K_{i})			Ratios	Refs
Compound	MOR	DOR	KOR	MOR:DOR:KOR	Refs
Naloxone	1.1 nM; 1.4 nM	16 nM; 67.5 nM	12 nM; 2.5 nM	1:15:11; 1:48:1.8	
(−)-Naloxone	0.559 nM; 0.93 nM	36.5 nM; 17 nM	4.91 nM; 2.3 nM	1:65:9; 1:18:2	
(+)-Naloxone	3,550 nM >1,000 nM	122,000 nM >1,000 nM	8,950 nM >1,000 nM	1:34:3; ND	

Naloxone is a lipophilic compound that acts as a non-selective and competitive opioid receptor antagonist. The pharmacologically active isomer of naloxone is (−)-naloxone. Naloxone's binding affinity is highest for the μ-opioid receptor (MOR), then the δ-opioid receptor (DOR), and lowest for the κ-opioid receptor (KOR); naloxone has negligible affinity for the nociceptin receptor.

If naloxone is administered in the absence of concomitant opioid use, no functional pharmacological activity occurs, except the inability of the body to combat pain naturally; since pure mu-opioid antagonists like naloxone and naltrexone block the effects of endorphins. In contrast to direct opiate agonists, which elicit opiate withdrawal symptoms when discontinued in opiate-tolerant people, no evidence indicates the development of tolerance or dependence on naloxone. The mechanism of action is not completely understood, but studies suggest it functions to produce withdrawal symptoms by competing for opioid receptors within the brain (a competitive antagonist, not a direct agonist), thereby preventing the action of both endogenous and xenobiotic opioids on these receptors without directly producing any effects itself.

A single administration of naloxone at a relatively high dose of 2 mg by intravenous injection has been found to produce brain MOR blockade of 80% at 5 minutes, 47% at 2 hours, 44% at 4 hours, and 8% at 8 hours. A low dose (2 μg/kg) produced brain MOR blockade of 42% at 5 minutes, 36% at 2 hours, 33% at 4 hours, and 10% at 8 hours. Intranasal administration of naloxone via nasal spray has likewise been found to rapidly occupy brain MORs, with peak occupancy occurring at 20 minutes, peak occupancies of 67% at a dose of 2 mg and 85% with 4 mg, and an estimated half-life of occupancy disappearance of approximately 100 minutes (1.67 hours).

=== Pharmacokinetics ===
When administered parenterally (non-orally or non-rectally, e.g., intravenously or by injection), as is most common, naloxone has a rapid distribution throughout the body. The mean serum half-life has been shown to range from 30 to 81 minutes, shorter than the average half-life of some opiates, necessitating repeat dosing if opioid receptors must be stopped from triggering for an extended period. Naloxone is primarily metabolized by the liver. Its major metabolite is naloxone-3-glucuronide, which is excreted in the urine. For people with liver diseases such as alcoholic liver disease or hepatitis, naloxone usage has not been shown to increase serum liver enzyme levels.

Naloxone has low systemic bioavailability when taken by mouth due to hepatic first-pass metabolism, but it does block opioid receptors that are located in the intestine.

== Chemistry ==
Naloxone, also known as N-allylnoroxymorphone or as 17-allyl-4,5α-epoxy-3,14-dihydroxymorphinan-6-one, is a synthetic morphinan derivative and was derived from oxymorphone (14-hydroxydihydromorphinone), an opioid analgesic. Oxymorphone, in turn, was derived from morphine, an opioid analgesic and naturally occurring constituent of the opium poppy. Naloxone is a racemic mixture of two enantiomers, (–)-naloxone (levonaloxone) and (+)-naloxone (dextronaloxone), only the former of which is active at opioid receptors. The drug is highly lipophilic, allowing it to rapidly penetrate the brain and to achieve a far greater brain to serum ratio than that of morphine. Opioid antagonists related to naloxone include cyprodime, nalmefene, nalodeine, naloxol, and naltrexone.

== History ==
Naloxone was patented in 1961 by Mozes J. Lewenstein, Jack Fishman, and the company Sankyo. It was approved for opioid use disorder treatment in the United States in 1971.

== Society and culture ==
=== Misinformation ===
Naloxone has been subject to much inaccurate media reporting and many urban legends about it have become prevalent.

One such myth is that naloxone makes the recipient violent. Another is that events called "Lazarus parties" have taken place, in which people reportedly took fatal overdoses in anticipation of being treated with naloxone; in reality this was a fiction spread by the police. Yet another is the claim that people have indulged in "yo-yoing", whereby they would take naloxone and opioids simultaneously to enjoy an extreme "high" and subsequent revival; the idea is scientifically nonsensical.

=== Names ===
Naloxone is its international nonproprietary name, British Approved Name, Dénomination Commune Française, Denominazione Comune Italiana, and Japanese Accepted Name, while naloxone hydrochloride is its United States Adopted Name and British Approved Name (Modified).

The patent has expired and it is available as a generic medication. Several formulations use patented dispensers (spray mechanisms or autoinjectors), and patent disputes over the generic forms of the nasal spray were litigated between 2016 and 2020 when a judge ruled in favor of Teva, the generic manufacturer. Teva announced entry of the first generic nasal spray formulation in December 2021. Brand names of naloxone include Narcan, Kloxxado, Nalone, Evzio, Prenoxad Injection, Narcanti, Narcotan, and Zimhi, among others.

=== Legal status and availability to law enforcement and emergency personnel ===
Naloxone (Nyxoid) was approved for use in the European Union in September 2017.

In the United States, some nasal naloxone are legally available without a prescription.

As of 2019, officials in 29 states had issued standing orders to enable licensed pharmacists to provide naloxone to patients without the individual first visiting a prescriber. Prescribers working with harm reduction or low threshold treatment programs have also issued standing orders to enable these organizations to distribute naloxone to their clients. A standing order, also referred to as a "non-patient specific prescription" is written by a physician, nurse or other prescriber to authorize medicine distribution outside the doctor-patient relationship. In the case of naloxone, these orders are meant to facilitate naloxone distribution to people using opioids, and their family members and friends. Over 200 naloxone distribution programs utilize licensed prescribers to distribute the drug through such orders, or through the authority of pharmacists (as with California's legal provision, AB1535).

Laws and policies in many US jurisdictions have been changed to allow wider distribution of naloxone. In addition to laws or regulations permitting distribution of medicine to at-risk individuals and families, some 36 states have passed laws that provide naloxone prescribers with immunity against both civil and criminal liabilities. While paramedics in the US have carried naloxone for decades, law enforcement officers in many states throughout the country carry naloxone to reverse the effects of heroin overdoses when reaching the location before paramedics. As of 12 July 2015, law enforcement departments in 28 US states are allowed to or required to carry naloxone to quickly respond to opioid overdoses. Programs training fire personnel in opioid overdose response using naloxone have also shown promise in the US, and efforts to integrate opioid fatality prevention into emergency response have grown due to the US overdose crisis.

Following the use of the nasal spray device by police officers on Staten Island in New York, an additional 20,000 police officers began carrying naloxone in mid-2014. The state's Office of the Attorney General provided US$1.2 million to supply nearly 20,000 kits. Police Commissioner William Bratton said: "Naloxone gives individuals a second chance to get help". Emergency Medical Service Providers (EMS) routinely administer naloxone, except where basic Emergency Medical Technicians are prohibited by policy or by state law. In efforts to encourage citizens to seek help for possible opioid overdoses, many states have adopted Good Samaritan laws that provide immunity against certain criminal liabilities for anybody who, in good faith, seeks emergency medical care for either themselves or someone around them who may be experiencing an opioid overdose.

States including Vermont and Virginia have developed programs that mandate the prescription of naloxone when a prescription has exceeded a certain level of morphine milliequivalents per day as preventative measures against overdose. Healthcare institution-based naloxone prescription programs have also helped reduce rates of opioid overdose in North Carolina, and have been replicated in the US military.

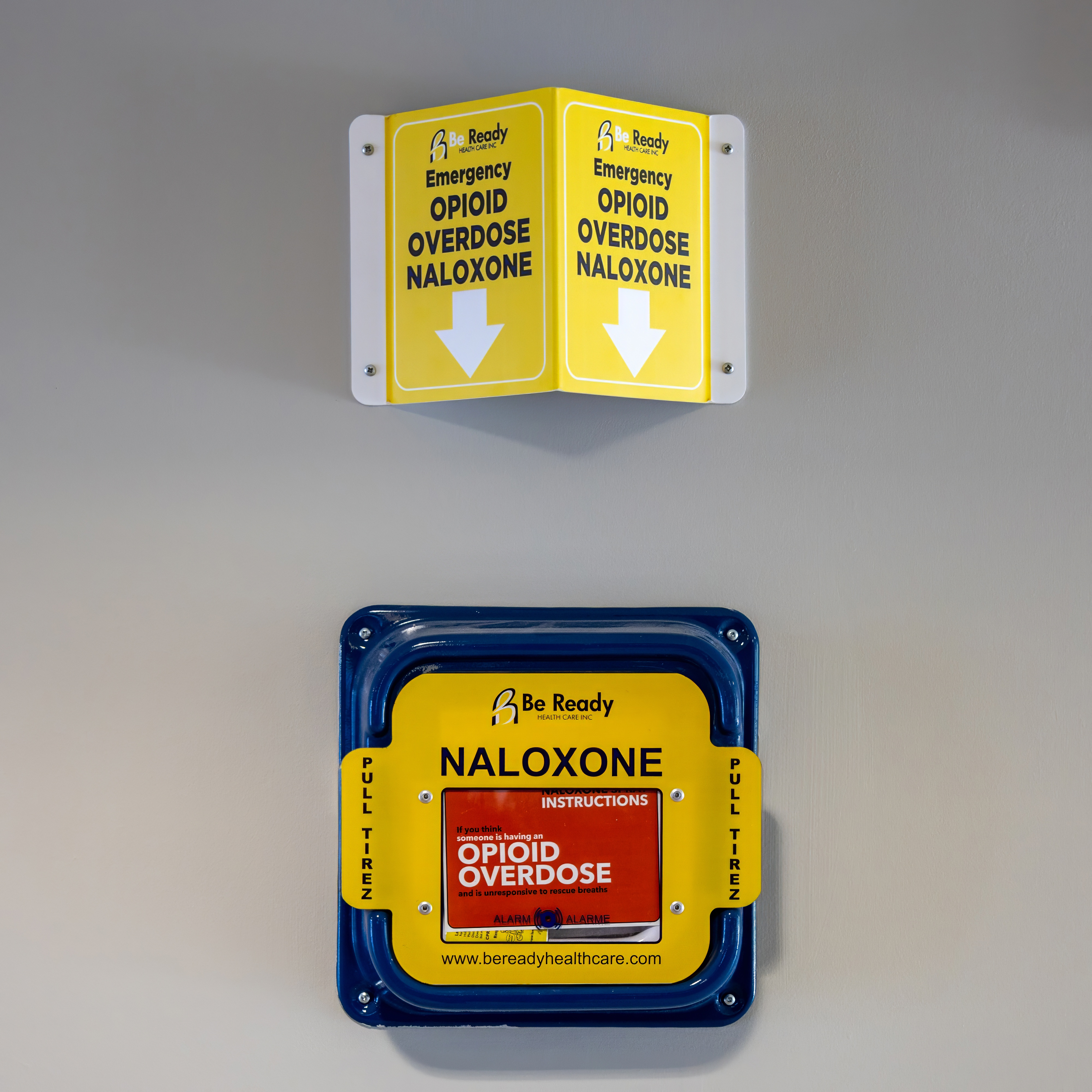
An emergency naloxone kit in Calgary, Alberta

In Canada, naloxone single-use syringe kits are distributed and available at various clinics and emergency rooms. Alberta Health Services is increasing the distribution points for naloxone kits at all emergency rooms, and various pharmacies and clinics province-wide. All Edmonton Police Service and Calgary Police Service patrol cars carry an emergency single-use naloxone syringe kit. Some Royal Canadian Mounted Police patrol vehicles also carry the drug, occasionally in excess to help distribute naloxone among users and concerned family/friends. Nurses, paramedics, medical technicians, and emergency medical responders can also prescribe and distribute the drug. As of February 2016, pharmacies across Alberta and some other Canadian jurisdictions are allowed to distribute single-use take-home naloxone kits or prescribe the drug to people using opioids.

Following Alberta Health Services, Health Canada reviewed the prescription-only status of naloxone, resulting in plans to remove it in 2016, making naloxone more accessible. Due to the rising number of drug deaths across the country, Health Canada proposed a change to make naloxone more widely available to Canadians in support of efforts to address the growing number of opioid overdoses. In March 2016, Health Canada did change the prescription status of naloxone, as "pharmacies are now able to proactively give out naloxone to those who might experience or witness an opioid overdose."

=== Community access ===
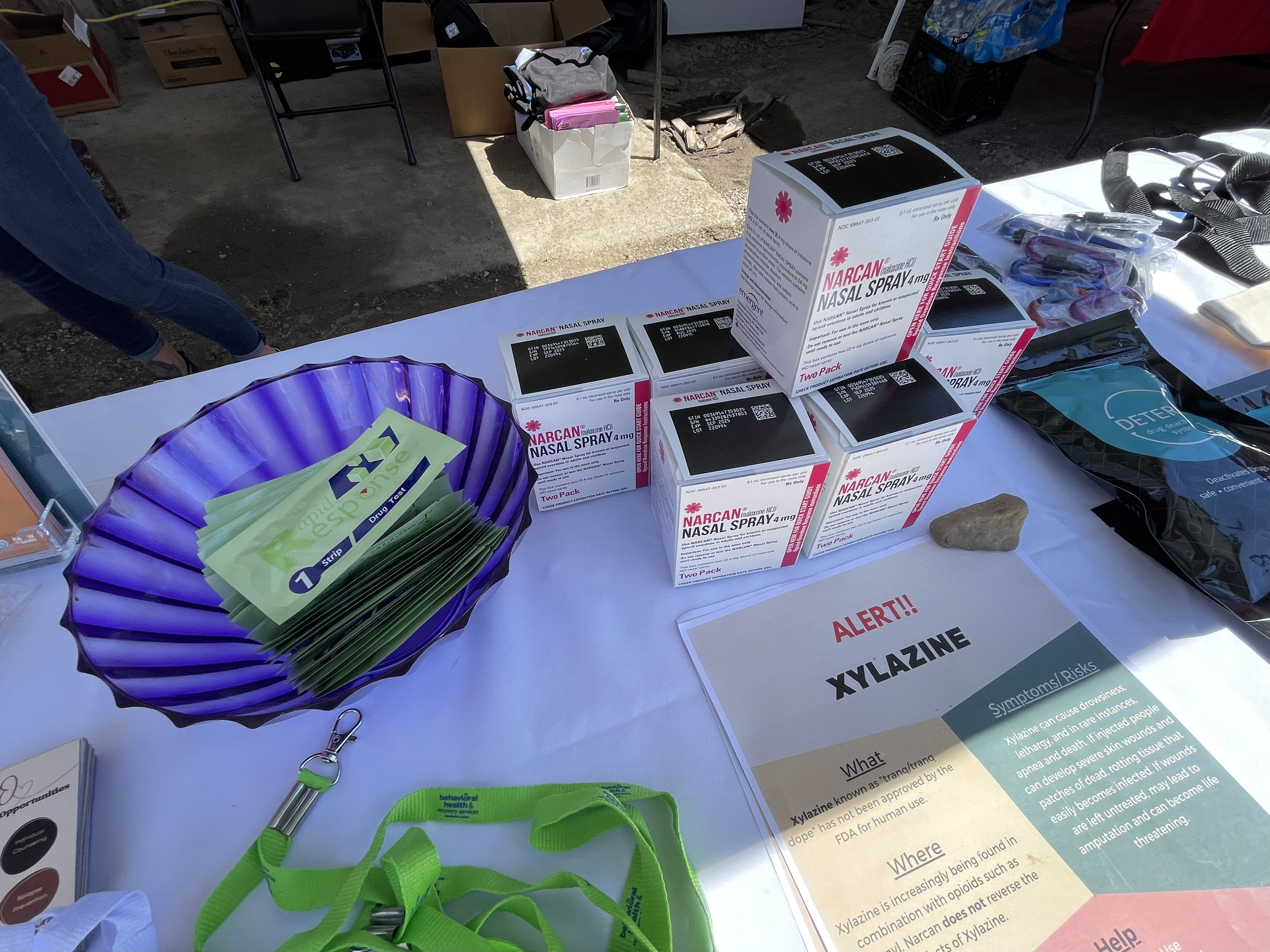
Free Narcan and test strips at a community event in Hopland, California

In a survey of US laypersons in December 2021, most people believed the scientifically supported idea that trained bystanders can reverse overdoses with naloxone.

A survey of US naloxone prescription programs in 2010 revealed that 21 out of 48 programs reported challenges in obtaining naloxone in the months leading up to the survey, due mainly to either cost increases that outstripped allocated funding or the suppliers' inability to fill orders. The approximate cost of a 1 ml ampoule of naloxone in the US is estimated to be significantly higher than in most other countries.

Take-home naloxone programs for people who use opioids are underway in many North American cities. CDC estimates that the US programs for drug users and their caregivers prescribing take-home doses of naloxone and training on its use prevented 10,000 opioid overdose deaths by 2014.

In Australia, some forms of naloxone are available "over the counter" in pharmacies free without a prescription under the Take Home Naloxone programme. It comes in single-use filled syringe form similar to law enforcement kits as well as nasal sprays. In 2024, those with a prescription can purchase five doses for around AU$32 or just over AU$6 per dose.

In Alberta, in addition to pharmacy distribution, take-home naloxone kits are available and distributed in most drug treatment or rehabilitation centers.

In the European Union, take home naloxone pilots were launched in the Channel Islands and in Berlin in the late 1990s. In 2008, the Welsh Assembly government announced its intention to establish demonstration sites for take-home naloxone, and in 2010, Scotland instituted a national naloxone program. Inspired by North American and European efforts, non-governmental organizations running programs to train drug users as overdose responders and supply them with naloxone are now operational in Russia, Ukraine, Georgia, Kazakhstan, Tajikistan, Afghanistan, China, Vietnam, and Thailand.

In October 2018, Emergent BioSolutions announced it would provide a free kit including two doses of the nasal spray, as well as educational materials, to each of the 16,568 public libraries and 2,700 YMCAs in the U.S.

In 2025, an American start-up released a keychain case to make naloxone more immediately accessible in emergencies.

In April 2025, the city of Nashville, Tennessee introduced its first naloxone vending machine at a gas station on West End Avenue. Within five weeks of installation, the machine had dispensed over 2,200 doses, significantly surpassing initial expectations. The program was funded by opioid settlement money. In November of the same year, the city introduced two more naloxone vending machines.

Other efforts to support community access have included partnerships with first response agencies around the United States to work with them to send "push messages" about getting trained on overdose response and carrying naloxone to residents in their communities.

== Veterinary use ==
Naloxone is used to reverse pure μ-opioid receptor agonists and for opioid reversal during cardiopulmonary arrest in cats and dogs. This is often given intravenously but instranasal administration works in the dog at higher doses. Renarcotisation can occur with naloxone administration, especially with morphinans. Naloxone administration has been reported to result in altered mental status and blepharospasm. Aetiology of this is unknown but could be due to either withdrawal, systemic hypertension, or rapid changes to the cerebral vascular tone. One study in horses reported that naloxone administration reduced increases in right ventricular pressure and heart rate caused by endotoxic shock.
