= VGX-1027 =

Chemical compound

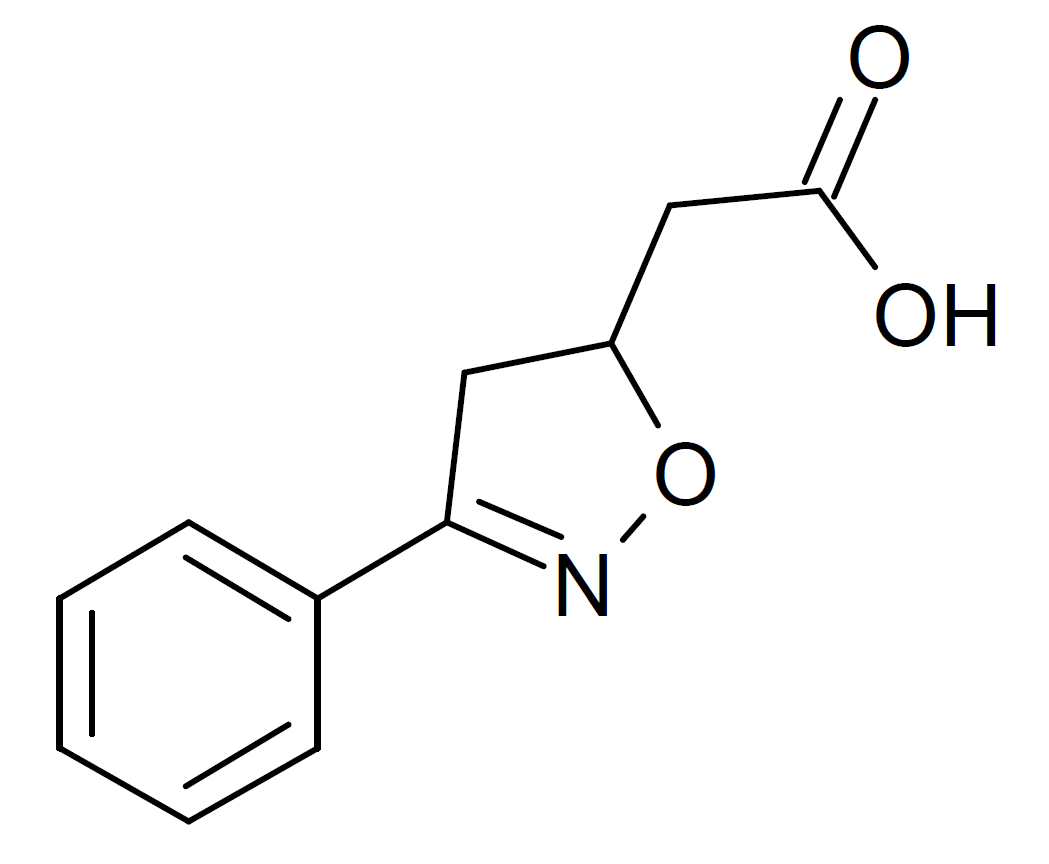

Identifiers
- IUPAC name: 2-(3-phenyl-4,5-dihydro-1,2-oxazol-5-yl)acetic acid
- CAS Number: 6501-72-0
- PubChem CID: 10798271
- ChemSpider: 8973577
- UNII: AKT814N13R
- ChEMBL: ChEMBL1320667
- CompTox Dashboard (EPA): DTXSID50445023

Chemical and physical data
- Formula: C_{11}H_{11}NO_{3}
- Molar mass: 205.213 g·mol^{−1}
- 3D model (JSmol): Interactive image
- SMILES: C1C(ON=C1C2=CC=CC=C2)CC(=O)O
- InChI: InChI=1S/C11H11NO3/c13-11(14)7-9-6-10(12-15-9)8-4-2-1-3-5-8/h1-5,9H,6-7H2,(H,13,14); Key:MUFJHYRCIHHATF-UHFFFAOYSA-N

VGX-1027 (GIT-27) is a drug which acts as an immunomodulator. It acts by blocking downstream signalling of the Toll-like receptors TLR2, TLR4 and TLR6, and thereby reducing production of various cytokines, including interleukins and TNF-α. In animal studies it has antiinflammatory effects and has been investigated for conditions such as arthritis and lung inflammation.
