= California Assembly Bill 1535 (2014) =

California Bill regarding overdose treatment

California State Legislature
- Full name: An act to amend Section 1714.22 of the Civil Code, relating to drug overdose treatment.
- Introduced: 2014-01-21
- Assembly voted: 2014-08-14
- Senate voted: 2014-08-07
- Signed into law: 2014-09-15
- Governor: Governor Jerry Brown
- Code: Business and Professions Code
- Section: 4052.01
- Resolution: AB 1535,
- Associated bills: AB 635 - Gives physicians and surgeons authority to prescribe opioid antagonists in emergencies where they lack it otherwise, provided they practice reasonable care,
- Website: Full text of the bill

Status: Current legislation

The California State Legislature passed an act to amend Section 1714.22 of the Civil Code, relating to drug overdose treatment in 2014. California Assembly Bill 1535 (2014) delegated the authority to all properly licensed California state pharmacists who had undergone a training program of at least one hour of continuing education about the pharmacology of naloxone hydrochloride to dispense naloxone (under brand names including Narcan and Ezvio) under standards developed by the Medical Board of California in conjunction with the California Society of Addiction Medicine, the California Pharmacists Association, and any other appropriate entities.

Although the bill does not require that naloxone be dispensed only to those at risk of needing it themselves directly rather than observing secondhand an emergency (suggesting family members of opiate addicts may be eligible, the bill does require with patient consent that the patient's primary care provider be notified with the consent of the patient only, and the legislative's counsel's digest suggests that under the bill trained pharmacists may dispense naloxone (presumably primarily as an off-label intranasal spray or Ezvio autoinjector unless the patient is trained to perform manual intramuscular injections in a way similar to how they currently dispense Plan B and other forms of oral birth control.)

== Reception ==
Counties in California that already had naloxone programs in place saw a lower rise in opiate related deaths than those that didn't, so the bill has generally been supported among professionals. On a national level, the American Medical Association endorses all measures that make it more likely naloxone will be found at the scene of an opiate overdose, including AB1535. The original bill was sponsored by both the California Pharmacist's Association and the Drug Policy Alliance, with the concurrence of several law enforcement groups, and no opposition.
