= Resatorvid =

Chemical compound

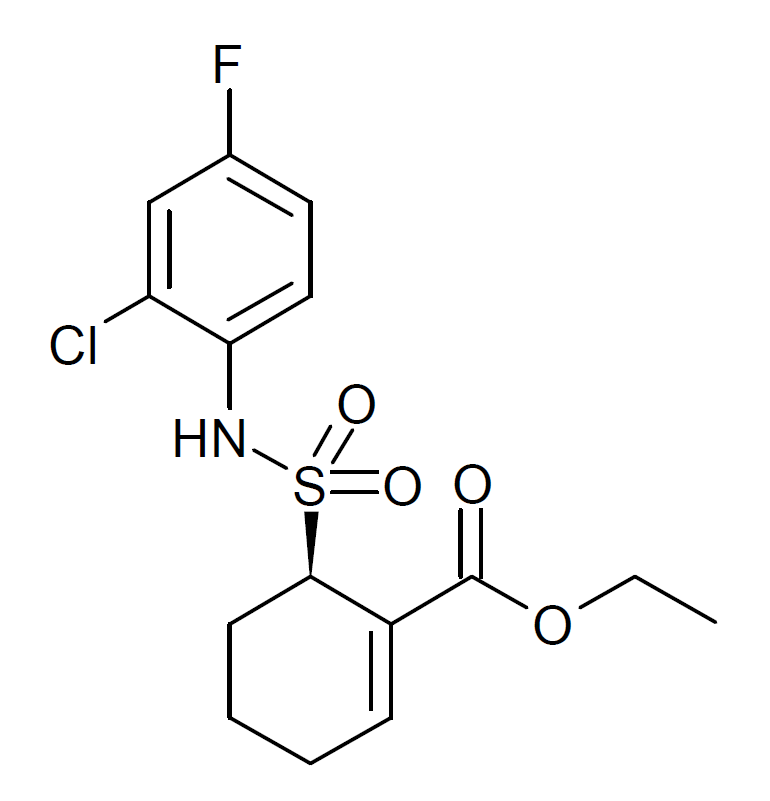

Clinical data
- Trade names: Resatorvid

Identifiers
- IUPAC name: ethyl (6R)-6-[(2-chloro-4-fluorophenyl)sulfamoyl]cyclohexene-1-carboxylate
- CAS Number: 243984-11-4
- PubChem CID: 11703255
- DrugBank: 05943
- ChemSpider: 9877978
- UNII: H2MZ648C31
- ChEMBL: ChEMBL225157
- CompTox Dashboard (EPA): DTXSID00947269

Chemical and physical data
- Formula: C_{15}H_{17}ClFNO_{4}S
- Molar mass: 361.81 g·mol^{−1}
- 3D model (JSmol): Interactive image
- SMILES: CCOC(=O)C1=CCCC[C@H]1S(=O)(=O)NC2=C(C=C(C=C2)F)Cl
- InChI: InChI=1S/C15H17ClFNO4S/c1-2-22-15(19)11-5-3-4-6-14(11)23(20,21)18-13-8-7-10(17)9-12(13)16/h5,7-9,14,18H,2-4,6H2,1H3/t14-/m1/s1; Key:LEEIJTHMHDMWLJ-CQSZACIVSA-N

Resatorvid (TAK-242) is a cyclohexane derivative that was invented by scientists at Takeda in a drug discovery campaign to identify inhibitors of the receptor TLR4. It binds directly to cysteine residue 747 intracellularly, preventing TLR4 binding with TIRAP and thus preventing downstream signal transduction.

A randomized, double-blinded Phase III trial of resatorvid in sepsis was halted early due to lack of efficacy, and the compound has become a widely used tool compound in biological research.

It has antiinflammatory and neuroprotective effects in preclinical models. It has been explored in preclinical studies of several forms of cancer, including multiple myeloma, breast cancer, and ovarian cancer, and has been suggested for study in skin cancers.

Efforts have been made to improve resatorvid by making prodrugs and deuterated derivatives.

== See also ==
- M62812
- TLR4-IN-C34
