= TLR4-IN-C34 =

Chemical compound

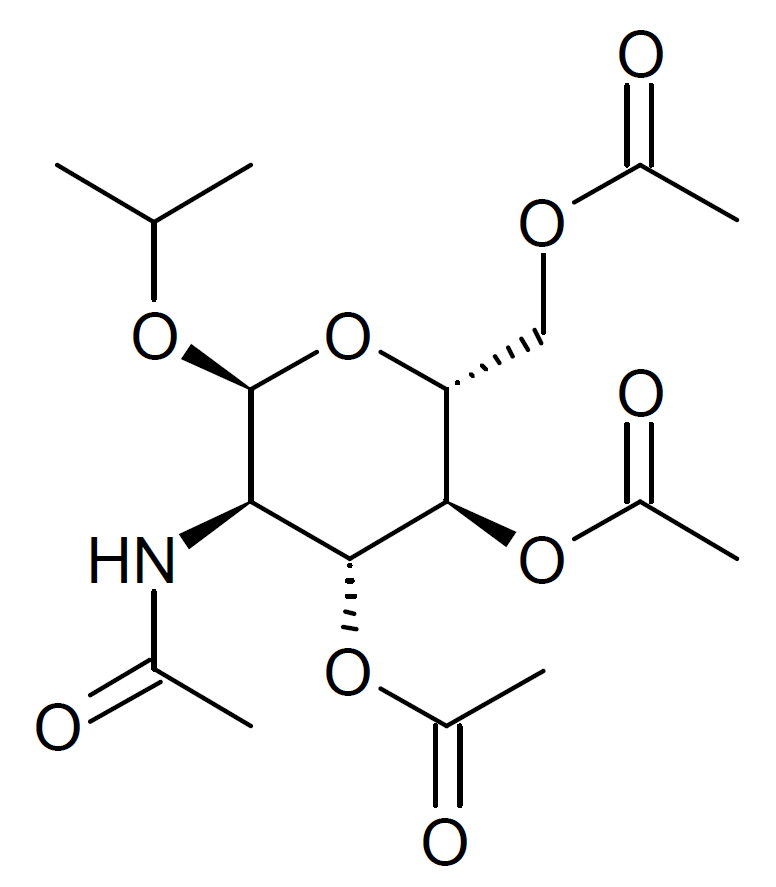

Identifiers
- IUPAC name: [(2R,3S,4R,5R,6S)-5-acetamido-3,4-diacetyloxy-6-propan-2-yloxyoxan-2-yl]methyl acetate
- CAS Number: 40592-88-9
- PubChem CID: 91691128
- ChemSpider: 34500445
- ChEMBL: ChEMBL4303607
- CompTox Dashboard (EPA): DTXSID001336698

Chemical and physical data
- Formula: C_{17}H_{27}NO_{9}
- Molar mass: 389.401 g·mol^{−1}
- 3D model (JSmol): Interactive image
- SMILES: CC(C)O[C@@H]1[C@@H]([C@H]([C@@H]([C@H](O1)COC(=O)C)OC(=O)C)OC(=O)C)NC(=O)C
- InChI: InChI=1S/C17H27NO9/c1-8(2)24-17-14(18-9(3)19)16(26-12(6)22)15(25-11(5)21)13(27-17)7-23-10(4)20/h8,13-17H,7H2,1-6H3,(H,18,19)/t13-,14-,15-,16-,17+/m1/s1; Key:KMIQMFHPUJUDMC-HHARLNAUSA-N

TLR4-IN-C34 (or C34) is a drug which acts as a potent and selective antagonist of Toll-like receptor 4 (TLR4). In animal studies it blocks TLR4-mediated cytokine release and has antiinflammatory effects.

== See also ==
- M62812
- Resatorvid
