= Septic shock =

Dangerously low blood pressure due to damage from an organ infection

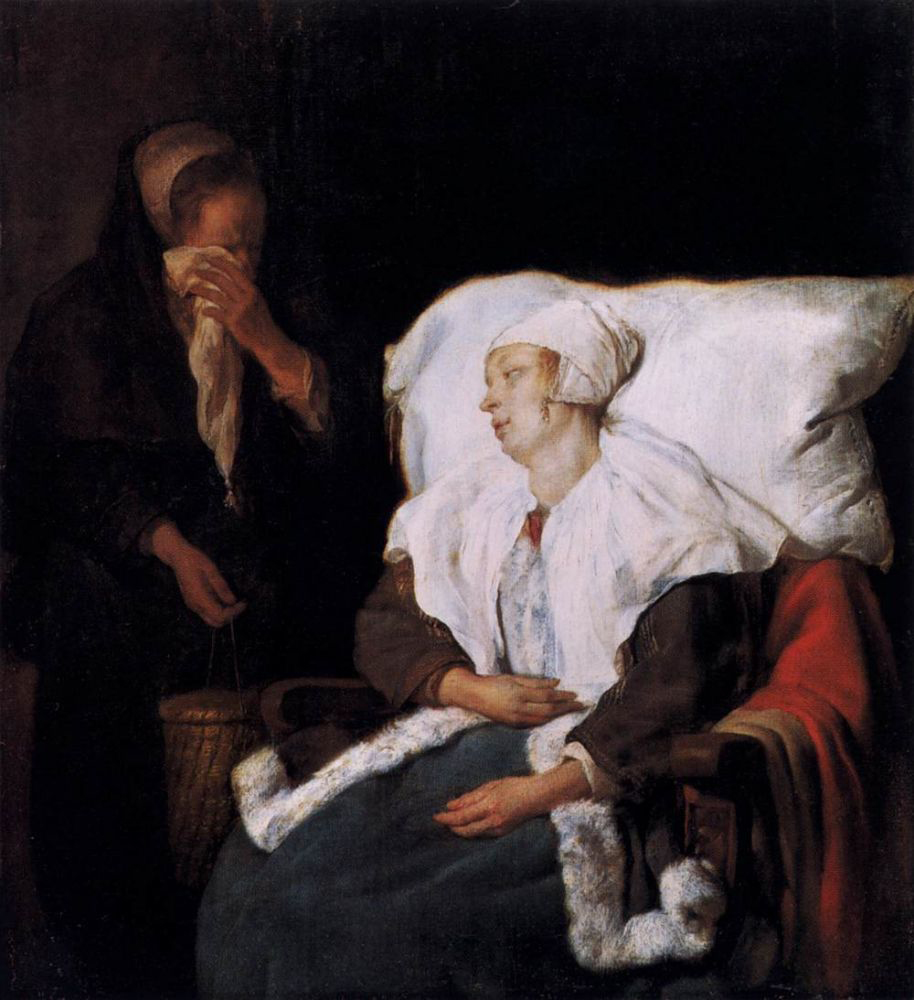
- Sepsis is one of the most common causes of death in critically ill patients in intensive care units. Oil by Gabriël Metsu.
- Specialty: Infectious disease, critical care medicine, emergency medicine

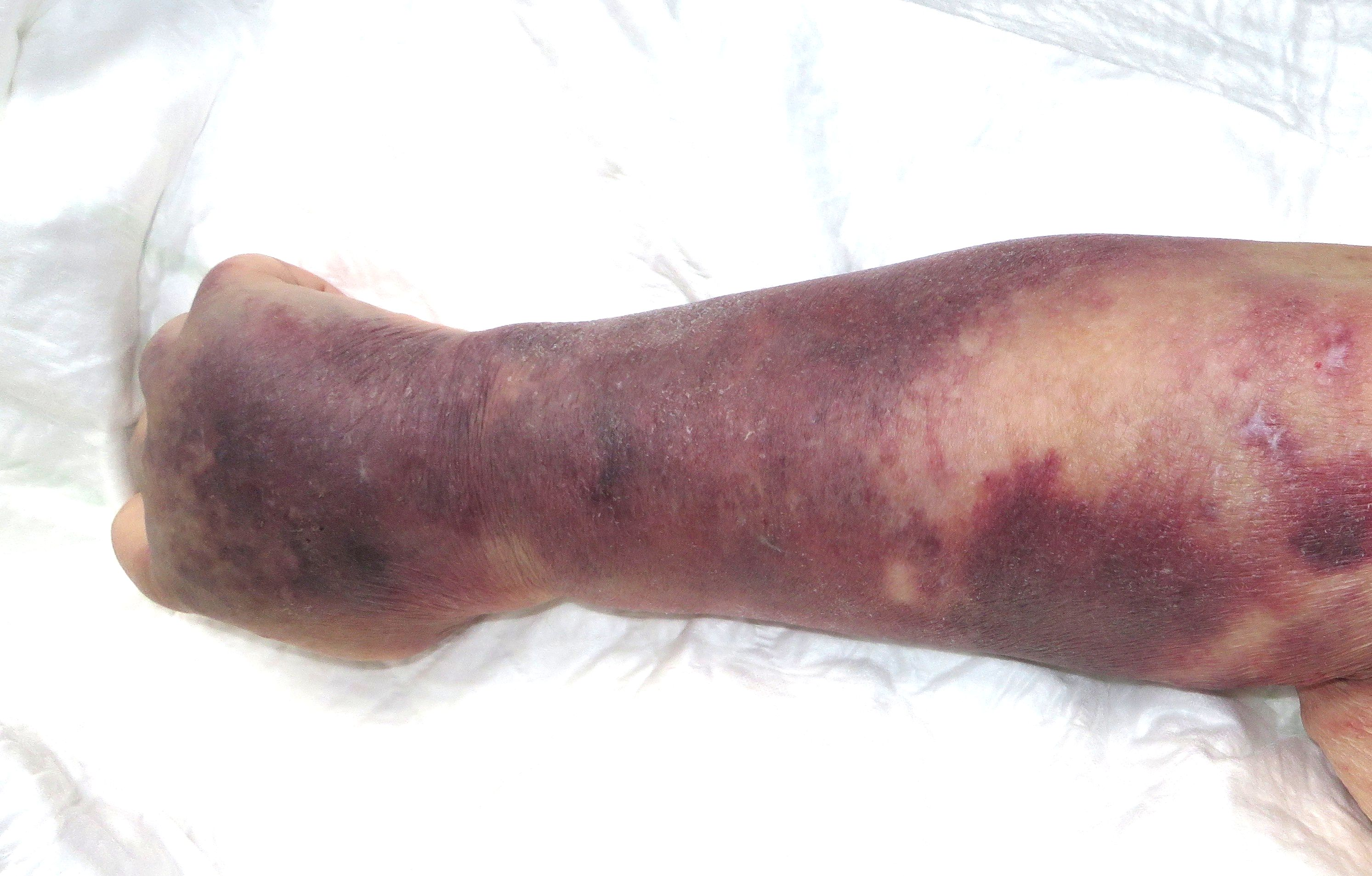
Purpura caused by thrombocytopenia on right hand in patient with septic shock

Septic shock is a potentially fatal medical condition that occurs when sepsis, which is defined as an abnormal immune response to infection that leads to life-threatening organ dysfunction, leads to dangerously low blood pressure, cellular abnormalities and metabolic dysfunction. The Third International Consensus Definitions for Sepsis and Septic Shock (Sepsis-3) defines septic shock as a subset of sepsis in which particularly profound circulatory, cellular, and metabolic abnormalities are associated with a greater risk of mortality than with sepsis alone. Patients with septic shock are cared for in the emergency department and intensive care units.

== Causes ==
Septic shock is a result of a systemic response to infection or multiple infectious causes. Sepsis always precedes septic shock; therefore, the causes of sepsis are also the causes of septic shock.

More than 80 percent of sepsis cases are caused by respiratory, genitourinary, skin and soft tissue, and gastrointestinal infections. Pneumonia is the most common cause of sepsis. Indwelling devices, such as pacemakers or knee replacements can also lead to sepsis. Severe infections, such as meningitis, encephalitis, and endocarditis, are also causes of sepsis. All together, indwelling devices and severe infections make up 1 percent of sepsis cases. Bacteria are the microorganisms responsible for a majority of cases of sepsis. About 62 percent are caused by gram-negative bacteria and 47 percent are caused by gram-positive bacteria. A small number of patients can have sepsis brought on by fungi, parasites, or viral infections. It is also possible that sepsis can be caused by multiple simultaneously occurring infections.

== Pathophysiology ==
The pathophysiology of septic shock is not entirely understood, but it is known that a key role in the development of severe sepsis is played by an immune and coagulation response to an infection. Both pro-inflammatory and anti-inflammatory responses play a role in septic shock. Septic shock involves a widespread inflammatory response that produces a hypermetabolic effect. This is manifested by increased cellular respiration, protein catabolism, and metabolic acidosis with a compensatory respiratory response.

Both gram positive and gram negative bacteria are the most common causes of septic shock. Toxins produced by pathogens cause an immune response; in gram-negative bacteria these are endotoxins, which are bacterial membrane lipopolysaccharides (LPS).

Cytokines released in a large-scale inflammatory response result in massive vasodilation, increased capillary permeability, decreased systemic vascular resistance, and low blood pressure. Finally, in an attempt to offset decreased blood pressure, myocardial dysfunction occurs with both systolic (decreased ability of the heart to squeeze) and diastolic (decreased ability of the heart to stretch to accommodate appropriate blood volume) dysfunction.

=== Gram-positive ===
In gram-positive bacteria, these are exotoxins or enterotoxins, which may vary depending on the species of bacteria. These are divided into three types. Type I, cell surface-active toxins, disrupt cells without entering, and include superantigens and heat-stable enterotoxins. Type II, membrane-damaging toxins, destroy cell membranes to enter and include hemolysins and phospholipases. Type III, intracellular toxins or A/B toxins interfere with internal cell function and include toxins secreted by streptococcus pyogenes or staphylococcus aureus.

=== Gram-negative ===
In gram-negative sepsis, a free LPS attaches to a circulating LPS-binding protein, and the complex then binds to the CD14 receptor on monocytes, macrophages, and neutrophils. Engagement of CD14 (even at doses as minute as 10 pg/mL) results in intracellular signaling via an associated "Toll-like receptor" protein 4 (TLR-4). This signaling activates nuclear factor kappaB (NF-κB), which leads to transcription of several genes that trigger a proinflammatory response. This results in significant activation of mononuclear cells and synthesis of effector cytokines such as IL-1, IL-6, and TNF-α. TLR-mediated activation helps to trigger the innate immune system to efficiently eradicate invading microbes, but the cytokines they produce also act on endothelial cells. There, they have a variety of effects, including reduced synthesis of anticoagulation factors such as tissue factor pathway inhibitor and thrombomodulin. The effects of the cytokines may be amplified by TLR-4 engagement on endothelial cells.

In response to inflammation, a compensatory reaction of production of anti-inflammatory substances such as IL-4, IL-10 antagonists, IL-1 receptor, and cortisol occurs. This is called compensatory anti-inflammatory response syndrome (CARS).

Both the inflammatory and anti-inflammatory reactions are responsible for the course of sepsis and are described as MARS (Mixed Antagonist Response Syndrome). The aim of these processes is to keep inflammation at an appropriate level. CARS often leads to suppression of the immune system, which leaves patients vulnerable to secondary infection. It was once thought that SIRS or CARS could predominate in a septic individual, and it was proposed that CARS follows SIRS in a two-wave process. It is now believed that the systemic inflammatory response and the compensatory anti-inflammatory response occur simultaneously.

At high levels of LPS, the syndrome of septic shock supervenes; the same cytokine and secondary mediators, now at high levels, result in systemic vasodilation (hypotension), diminished myocardial contractility, widespread endothelial injury, activation causing systemic leukocyte adhesion and diffuse alveolar capillary damage in the lung, and activation of the coagulation system culminating in disseminated intravascular coagulation (DIC).

The hypoperfusion from the combined effects of widespread vasodilation, myocardial pump failure, and DIC causes multiorgan system failure that affects the liver, kidneys, and central nervous system, among other organ systems. Recently, severe damage to liver ultrastructure has been noticed from treatment with cell-free toxins of Salmonella.

The ability of TLR4 to respond to a distinct LPS species is clinically important. Pathogenic bacteria may employ LPS with low biological activity to evade proper recognition by the TLR4/MD-2 system, dampening the host immune response and increasing the risk of bacterial dissemination. On the other hand, such LPS would not be able to induce septic shock in susceptible patients, rendering septic complications more manageable. Yet, defining and understanding how even the smallest structural differences between the very similar LPS species may affect the activation of the immune response may provide the mechanism for the fine tuning of the latter and new insights to immunomodulatory processes.

== Diagnosis ==
=== Definitions ===
Sepsis is the precipitating condition to septic shock, hence the diagnostic criteria for sepsis are pertinent to the diagnosis of septic shock.

There are three different systems to diagnosis sepsis. These are the systemic inflammatory response syndrome (SIRS) criteria, the full Sequential Organ Failure Assessment (SOFA), and the quick version of SOFA (qSOFA). The most recent gathering of professionals to discuss the topic of sepsis was called "sepsis-3" and set forth the latest guidelines for the diagnosis and management of sepsis.

==== SIRS ====
The SIRS criteria were recently excluded from sepsis-3, but are still the most used diagnostic tool for identifying sepsis. A patient that meets SIRS criteria has a possible, or documented, source of infection plus at least two or more of the criteria listed below.

- Tachypnea (fast rate of breathing), which is defined as more than 20 breaths per minute, or when testing blood gas, a PaCO_{2} less than 32 mm Hg, which signifies hyperventilation
- White blood cell count either significantly low (< 4000 cells/mm^{3}), or elevated (> 12000 cells/mm^{3})
- Tachycardia (rapid heart rate), which in sepsis is defined as a rate greater than 90 beats per minute
- Altered body temperature: Fever > 38.0 °C (100.4 °F) or hypothermia < 36.0 °C (96.8 °F)

Documented evidence of infection may include positive blood culture, signs of pneumonia on chest x-ray, or other radiologic or laboratory evidence of infection. Signs of end-organ dysfunction are present in septic shock, including kidney failure, liver dysfunction, changes in mental status, or elevated serum lactate. One limitation of the SIRS criteria is that it can be present in many non-infectious conditions, such as autoimmune conditions, pancreatitis, recent surgery, or vasculitis.

==== qSOFA and SOFA ====
qSOFA is another set of criteria used to diagnose sepsis and help clinicians identify sepsis in settings other than the ICU. Its counterpart SOFA is used exclusively in the ICU.

In the SOFA criteria, there are three criteria, which are listed below.

- respiratory rate of 22 breathes per minute or greater
- altered mental status
- systolic blood pressure of 100 mg or less

Patients meet SOFA criteria, and therefore have sepsis, when they fulfill 2 or more of the above criteria. qSOFA is typically limited as it is known to mainly identify patients who present late in the course of sepsis.

SOFA criteria is used in critically ill patients and assesses the severity of dysfunction in the 6 organ systems. At the time of ICU admission the score is calculated as the baseline. After this the score is calculated every 48 hours. Baseline is a score of zero which indicates no sepsis. An increase in score by 2 or more points indicates sepsis and an increased mortality of 20%.

==== Septic shock ====
Septic shock is a subclass of distributive shock, a condition in which abnormal distribution of blood flow in the smallest blood vessels results in inadequate blood supply to the body tissues, resulting in ischemia and organ dysfunction. Septic shock refers specifically to distributive shock due to sepsis as a result of infection.

Originally, septic shock was identified in patients based only on the presence of hypotension. However, in recent years, it has been found that hypotension is a later manifestation of septic shock. Specifically, lack of blood flow to the tissue (tissue hypoperfusion) has been found to occur well before hypotension in cases of septic shock. Therefore, a lactate measurement has become an integral part to the diagnosis of septic shock. This is because lactate is a marker of tissue hypoperfusion as this metabolic product is only produced by metabolic processes that occur in the absence of adequete oxygen supply to the tissue. A lactate level of 18 mg/dL (or 2 mmol per L) is diagnostic for septic shock according to sepsis-3. Another diagnostic criterion for septic shock is vasopressor therapy required to maintain a mean arterial pressure of 65 mmHg.

=== Signs and symptoms ===
==== General ====
The signs and symptoms of sepsis and septic shock vary depending on the precipitating cause. However, general signs and symptoms include fevers, rigors, hypothermia, diaphoresis, malaise. Although fever is the most common manifestation of sepsis it can be absent in some cases. In particular, fever can be absent in immunocompromised patients, older patients, and patients with chronic alcohol abuse. Additionally, higher mortality has been associated with patients presenting with hypothermia.

==== Cardiac ====
New murmur, tachycardia, hypotension, and warm and flushed skin.

==== Gastrointestinal ====
Abdominal rigidity, abdominal pain, vomiting, diarrhea, dysphagia, and abnormal distension.

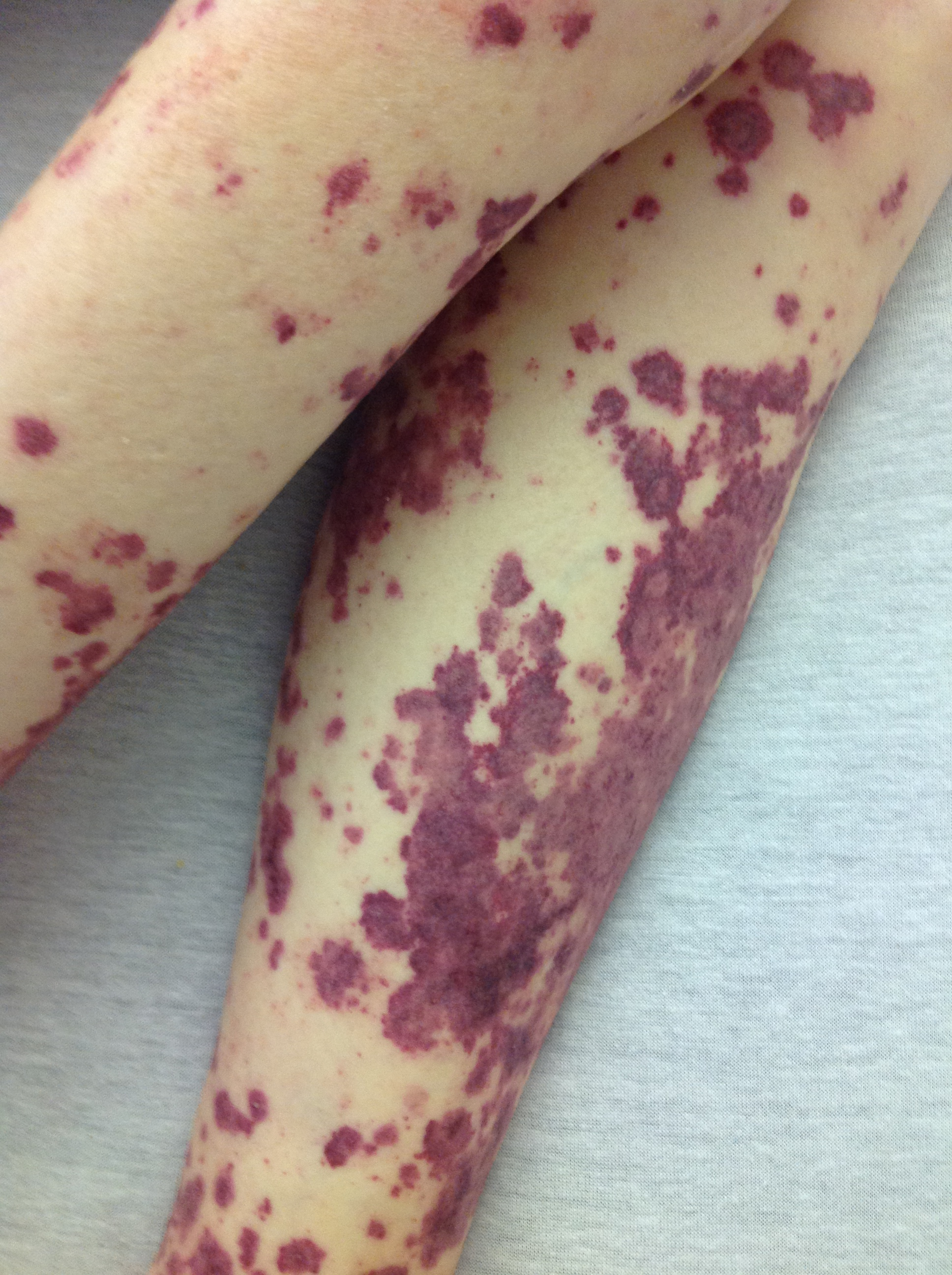
Petechial rash in a patient with septic shock. Picture of splinter hemorrhage in septic shock related to endocarditis.

==== Pulmonary ====
Cough, pleuritic chest pain, tachypnea, shortness of breath, and sore throat.

==== Neurologic ====
Altered mental status, headache, saddle anesthesia, neck stiffness or rigidity, and seizures.

==== Musculoskeletal ====
Joint pains, myalgias, edema, weakness, and crepitus.

==== Genitourinary ====
Dysuria, hematuria, costovertebral angle tenderness, pyuria, vaginal bleeding, and vaginal discharge.

==== Dermatologic ====
Petechiae, bullous lesions, erythema, rash, splinter hemorrhages, bruising, and purulent lesions.

=== Diagnostic tools ===
==== Imaging ====
Chest X-rays are typically indicated for every case of sepsis as pneumonia is the most common cause of sepsis. Depending on the clinical situation other imaging studies can be ordered. If endocarditis is suspected echocardiography is indicated. CT scans of the chest can also be used when empyema or infectious effusions are suspected. CT scans of other areas of the body can be used if abscesses are suspected.

==== Laboratory testing ====
A large amount of laboratory tests are indicated when sepsis is suspected. In terms of cultures, typically clinicians order two sets of peripheral blood cultures, urine cultures, stool cultures, sputum, and skin cultures. Special cultures, such as cerebrospinal, joint, or pleural cultures, are only ordered in certain clinical scenarios and are not the standard of care. Other laboratory tests ordered in the setting of sepsis include complete blood count with differential, basic metabolic panel, urinalysis, coagulation studies, and liver enzyme studies. Lastly, acid and base abnormalities are common in the setting of sepsis, therefore, arterial and venous blood samples are ordered.

==== Sepsis biomarkers ====
The two main biomarkers used for sepsis and septic shock are lactate and procalcitonin.

Lactate is used because lactate is produced in the body as a result of tissues receiving inadequate oxygen supply due to poor blood flow. Since tissues do not receive adequate blood flow in septic shock, lactate can be used to detect if a patient is in a state of septic shock. As mentioned above, a lactate level of 18 mg/dL (2 mmol per L) is diagnostic criteria for septic shock according to sepsis-3. Lactate levels are obtained when sepsis is first suspected. If the levels are elevated at that time then the measurement of lactate is repeated every four to six hours until the levels become normal again.

Procalcitonin can be used as an indicator for sepsis because it is a marker for inflammation produced by cytokines and bacterial endotoxins. A procalcitonin level of 0.05 ng/mL is considered normal and patients with procalcitonin levels less than 0.25 ng/mL have low likelihood of sepsis. Several studies have shown that the severity of sepsis and the procalcitonin levels have a statistically significant relationship. Although no specific diagnostic cutoffs for procalcitonin levels currently exist, some trials have noted that patients with mean levels of 9.6 ng/mL typically have sepsis with no shock, and patients with mean levels of 32.7 ng/mL typically have septic shock.

== Treatment ==
Treatment primarily consists of the following:

1. Giving intravenous fluids
2. Early antibiotic administration
3. Early goal directed therapy
4. Rapid source identification and control
5. Support of major organ dysfunction

=== Fluids ===
Because lowered blood pressure in septic shock contributes to poor perfusion, obtaining vascular access and performing fluid resuscitation is an initial treatment to increase blood volume. Patients demonstrating sepsis-induced hypoperfusion should be initially resuscitated with at least 30 ml/kg of intravenous crystalloid within the first three hours. It is considered acceptable to infuse one liter boluses within the first 30 minutes.

Fluid resuscitation helps in the treatment of septic shock because it enhances preload and cardiac output, which improves oxygen delivery.

Crystalloids such as normal saline and lactated Ringer's solution are recommended as the initial fluid of choice, while the use of colloid solutions such as hydroxyethyl starch have not shown any advantage or decrease in mortality. When large quantities of fluids are given, administering albumin has shown some benefit.

After initial fluid resuscitation, frequent reassessment of patient fluid balance is required to avoid over- or under- hydration. This is of more importance in patients with heart failure, acute lung injury, or chronic renal disease as volume overload can be devastating to these patients. Fluid balance can be assessed in many ways such as, dynamic blood pressure response, urine output (should be greater than 0.5 mL per hour), lactate clearance, ultrasound of the inferior vena cava, passive leg raise, and pulse pressure variation.

Fluid administration should be restricted in the later components of sepsis management. At 72 hours patients should ideally have a fluid balance of zero. This is because it has been shown that each one liter of over-hydration increases the risk of death.

=== Antibiotics ===
==== General approach ====
Early initiation of antibiotic therapy is associated with better outcomes in multiple studies. At one point it was recommended that antibiotics be administered one hour after initial recognition of sepsis. However, several subsequent studies have found that there was no difference in mortality between patients receiving antibiotics within one hour and those receiving them beyond one hour. However, it has been shown that mortality rates are higher for those who received antibiotic therapy after three hours.

At first antibiotic therapy should be broad and based on a combination of factors, such as the suspected infection site, clinical context (community or hospital acquired), most likely pathogen, and local resistance patterns. Once cultures definitively reveal the pathogen responsible for the infection, the antibiotic selection can be narrowed or changed as appropriate. This specific approach reduces treatment cost, avoids drug toxicity, and reduces the risk of antimicrobial resistance.

De-escalation of antibiotic therapy is controversial and no consensus has been reached in the literature. Factors that are used to decide de-escalation of antibiotic therapy include the use of biomarkers, such as a decreasing procalcitonin, to monitor response to therapy or clinical progress during treatment.

Typically most patients can be effectively treated with 7–10 days of antibiotic therapy. However, specific infections such as endocarditis and osteomyelitis and infections caused by indwelling devices that cannot be removed may require longer durations of antibiotic therapy.

=== Specific antibiotic treatment choices for different infections causing sepsis ===
==== Meningitis ====
To treat meningitis-related sepsis, one can administer vancomycin, ceftriaxone, ampicillin, and dexamethasone (a corticosteroid used as an anti-inflammatory to reduce neuro complications). If the patient has an allergy to beta-lactams, one can administer vancomycin, moxifloxacin, and trimethoprim/sulfamethoxazole (TMP-SMX). If herpes encephalitis is suspected then acyclovir can be administered.

==== Pulmonary infection ====
For community-acquired pneumonia without risk for drug resistance, a fluoroquinolone can be given, or ceftriaxone and azithromycin, or ceftriaxone and doxycycline. For community-acquired pneumonia with risk for drug resistance or hospital-acquired pneumonia, a fluoroquinolone can be given, or zoysn, or cefepime, or carbapenem. If the patient has a beta lactam allergy one can give aztreonam and a fluoroquinolone. Vancomycin should be added in the cases of empyema.

==== Skin and soft-tissue infection ====
Can administer vancomycin or linezolid with zosyn, or carbapenem, or cefepime and metronidazole. If a necrotizing infection is suspected then a carbapenem with vancomycin and clindamycin is recommended and surgery should also be consulted.

==== Intrabdominal infections ====
Can administer zoysn, or carbapenem, or primaxin, or flagyl. If the patient has a beta lactam allergy then vancomycin with aztreonam and metronidazole can be given. Surgery should also be consulted in cases of intrabdominal infection.

==== Neutropenia with infection ====
Can administer cefepime, or zoysn, or carbapenem, or ceftazidime. If the patient has a beta lactam allergy then aztreonam with vancomycin or ciprofloxacin with clindamycin can be given. If the patient is neutropenic with septic shock, pneumonia, has an infected venous catheter, skin and soft-tissue infection, gram-positive bacteremia, or mucositis then vancomycin should be added.

==== Unknown infections ====
Can administer vancomycin with levofloxacin.

=== Vasopressors ===
The first line vasopressor for septic shock is norepinephrine. This is indicated when patients do not have their mean arterial pressure restored to 65 mmHg or greater after initial fluid resuscitation. It has been shown that vasopressor therapy increases survival in patients with septic shock. It has also been shown that the mortality of patients with septic shock increases by 5% per hour that the vasopressor is not given. Norepinephrine is started at 2-5 mcg per minute and can rise as high as 35-90 mcg per minute.

If norepinephrine cannot restore the mean arterial pressure to 65 mmHg or more, then vasopressin can be added as a second-line agent. This can rise to 0.03 mcg per minute. If the mean arterial pressure is still not restored then epinephrine can be added at 20-50 mcg per minute.

Vasopressors are typically given through a central venous catheter. If the placement of a central venous catheter is delayed then norepinephrine can be given through a peripheral IV. Vasopressors are given through a central venous catheter due to concerns over tissue injury and damage that can occur if they are given through a peripheral IV. In more recent years it has been shown, however, that giving vasopressors through a peripheral IV is safe for short-term use and offers practical advantages.

=== Corticosteroids ===
Corticosteroids are recommended for patients with septic shock requiring vasopressors. The most common regimen of corticosteroids for patients with septic shock is 200–300 mg/ day of hydrocortisone for 5–7 days. This can be administered as a continuous infusion or given in divided doses.

Recent evidence has shown that corticosteroids can reduce the short-term in hospital mortality associated with septic shock. Corticosteroids have been shown to result in higher rates of shock reversal and reduced organ dysfunction at seven days.

The adverse effects of the corticosteroids include neuromuscular weakness, however, the available evidence has shown that the benefits outweigh the risks of adverse effects for patients with septic shock.

=== Other ===
==== β-Blockers ====
New evidence has shown that short-acting β-blockers can be used during the treatment of septic shock to reduce the onset of new tachyarrhythmias and have been shown to reduce 28-day mortality. However, it has also been shown that β-blockers can increase the duration that patients would need to be on vasopressors.

==== Blood purification modalities ====
Blood purification modalities, such as column hemoperfusion, have been suggested as treatment options for septic shock. However, the current evidence behind these treatment options is weak and they are not the standard of care for patients with septic shock.

==== Methylene blue ====
Methylene blue is not listed as a current treatment in the most recent guidelines for septic shock, but is an investigational and off-label therapy. There are multiple meta-analyses that suggest that methylene blue could reduce mortality in cases of septic shock. Methylene blue has also been shown to reduce time to vasopressor discontinuation, length of ICU stay, and mechanical ventilation duration. Some studies have suggested that methylene blue can be useful in cases of refractory shock or cathecolamine-resistant shock.

== Epidemiology ==
Sepsis has a worldwide incidence of more than 49 million cases a year, with 11 million sepsis-related deaths per year. Septic shock occurs in approximately 8-10% of ICU admissions. Septic shock has a mortality rate of 40 percent despite advances in care. About one third of hospital deaths are due to sepsis in the United States and healthcare costs associated with sepsis exceeded $38 billion in 2017.

The risk of septic shock increases at age 60, with those at age 70 having the highest risk of dying from sepsis.

The mortality rate from sepsis, especially if it is not treated rapidly with the needed medications in a hospital, is approximately 40% in adults and 25% in children. The in-hospital mortality for septic shock specifically has been shown to increase 1.8% for each additional hour that antibiotics are not administered after the patient has arrived in the emergency department.
