= (+)-Naloxone =

Drug

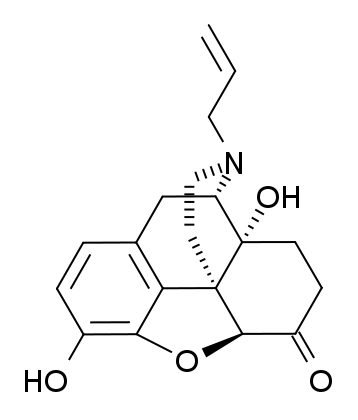

Clinical data
- MedlinePlus: a601092

Legal status
- Legal status: Investigational

Identifiers
- IUPAC name: (1R,5S,13S,17R)- 10,17-dihydroxy- 4-(prop-2-en-1-yl)- 12-oxa- 4-azapentacyclo [9.6.1.0^{1,13}.0^{5,17}.0^{7,18}] octadeca- 7(18),8,10-trien- 14-one
- CAS Number: 65700-73-4
- PubChem CID: 5491858
- ChemSpider: 4590735
- UNII: 54MPN7YN98
- CompTox Dashboard (EPA): DTXSID401029677

Chemical and physical data
- Formula: C_{19}H_{21}NO_{4}
- Molar mass: 327.380 g·mol^{−1}
- 3D model (JSmol): Interactive image
- SMILES: C=CCN1CC[C@@]23[C@H]4C(=O)CC[C@@]2([C@@H]1CC5=C3C(=C(C=C5)O)O4)O
- InChI: InChI=1S/C19H21NO4/c1-2-8-20-9-7-18-15-11-3-4-12(21)16(15)24-17(18)13(22)5-6-19(18,23)14(20)10-11/h2-4,14,17,21,23H,1,5-10H2/t14-,17+,18+,19-/m0/s1; Key:UZHSEJADLWPNLE-PIKADFDJSA-N

(+)-Naloxone (dextro-naloxone) is a drug which is the opposite enantiomer of the opioid antagonist drug (−)-naloxone. Unlike (−)-naloxone, (+)-naloxone has no significant affinity for opioid receptors, but instead has been discovered to act as a selective antagonist of Toll-like receptor 4 (TLR4). This receptor is involved in immune system responses, and activation of TLR4 induces glial activation and release of inflammatory mediators such as TNF-α and Interleukin-1. Many opioid drugs activate TLR4, leading to several long-term side effects.

== Potential applications ==
=== Counteracting TLR4 activation by opioids ===
Both active and inactive enantiomers of various opioid analgesic drugs including morphine, meperidine, fentanyl, methadone and buprenorphine, as well as some otherwise inactive metabolites like morphine-3-glucuronide, have been found to act as agonists of TLR4, and chronic use of these drugs consequently causes constant low-level release of TNF-α and IL-1β as well as other downstream effects. This is thought to be involved in various adverse properties of opioid analgesic drugs, such as loss of efficacy with extended use and the associated development of tolerance and dependence, as well as the development of side effects such as hyperalgesia and allodynia, which can cause long-term use of opioid analgesics to not only fail to treat neuropathic pain, but ultimately exacerbate it.

Several opioid antagonist drugs were found to act as antagonists for TLR4, including naloxone and naltrexone. However it was found that not only the (−) enantiomers, but also the (+) enantiomers of these drugs acted as TLR4 antagonists (though (+)-nalmefene was inactive). Since (+)-naloxone and (+)-naltrexone lack affinity for opioid receptors, they do not block the effects of opioid analgesic drugs, and so can be used to counteract the TLR4-mediated side effects of opioid agonists without affecting analgesia. For example, the reinforcing effects of opioid drugs is mediated by TLR4 and (+)-naloxone deminishes that effect.

=== Neuroprotective agent ===
(+)-Naloxone was also found to be neuroprotective due to reduction of TLR4-mediated inflammation, and both (+)-naloxone and (+)-naltrexone are effective in their own right at treating symptoms of neuropathic pain in animal models.

=== Additional actions ===
However (+)-naloxone was also found to reduce the hyperactive effects of stimulant drugs, suggesting additional actions beyond TLR4 antagonism (possibly as a sigma receptor antagonist), that might potentially result in unwanted side effects or drug interactions.

== See also ==
- Dextromethorphan
- Eritoran
- Methylnaltrexone
