= Toll-like receptor 4 =

Cell surface receptor found in humans

TLR4
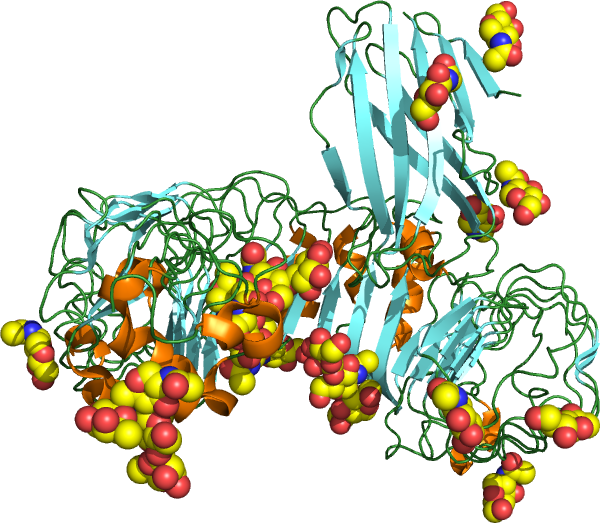

Identifiers
- Aliases: TLR4, ARMD10, CD284, TLR-4, TOLL, toll like receptor 4
- External IDs: OMIM: 603030; MGI: 96824; GeneCards: TLR4
Available structures
PDB	Ortholog search: PDBe RCSB
PDB	List of PDB id codes 4G8A, 2Z62, 2Z63, 2Z65, 2Z66, 3FXI, 3UL7, 3UL8, 3UL9, 3ULA

Gene location (Human)
Chr.	Chromosome 9 (human)
Band	9q33.1	Start	117,704,175 bp
Band	9q33.1	End	117,724,735 bp

Gene location (Mouse)
Chr.	Chromosome 4 (mouse)
Band	4 C1|4 34.66 cM	Start	66,745,821 bp
Band	4 C1|4 34.66 cM	End	66,848,521 bp
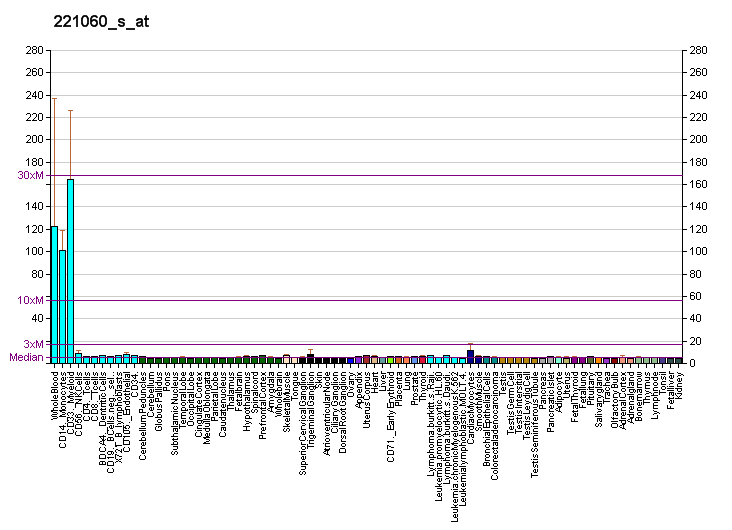
RNA expression pattern
Bgee	Human / Mouse (ortholog); Top expressed in: monocyte; Achilles tendon; blood; bone marrow; trabecular bone; spleen; granulocyte; right lung; gallbladder; bone marrow cell / Top expressed in: lumbar spinal ganglion; aortic valve; ascending aorta; granulocyte; decidua; epithelium of stomach; stroma of bone marrow; endothelial cell of lymphatic vessel; cervix; mucous cell of stomach; More reference expression data
BioGPS	More reference expression data
Gene ontology
Molecular function	lipopolysaccharide immune receptor activity; lipopolysaccharide binding; protein binding; transmembrane signaling receptor activity
Cellular component	cytoplasm; membrane; perinuclear region of cytoplasm; cell surface; integral component of membrane; plasma membrane; endosome membrane; intrinsic component of plasma membrane; integral component of plasma membrane; lipopolysaccharide receptor complex; external side of plasma membrane
Biological process	positive regulation of MHC class II biosynthetic process; positive regulation of JNK cascade; TRIF-dependent toll-like receptor signaling pathway; cellular response to mechanical stimulus; positive regulation of interleukin-8 production; positive regulation of ERK1 and ERK2 cascade; T-helper 1 type immune response; positive regulation of platelet activation; positive regulation of interleukin-1 production; positive regulation of stress-activated MAPK cascade; positive regulation of NLRP3 inflammasome complex assembly; positive regulation of interleukin-12 production; positive regulation of interferon-alpha production; I-kappaB phosphorylation; positive regulation of nitric-oxide synthase biosynthetic process; positive regulation of B cell proliferation; defense response to bacterium; positive regulation of interleukin-6 production; activation of innate immune response; positive regulation of tumor necrosis factor production; negative regulation of tumor necrosis factor production; innate immune response; negative regulation of interleukin-17 production; I-kappaB kinase/NF-kappaB signaling; positive regulation of interferon-beta production; positive regulation of inflammatory response; toll-like receptor 4 signaling pathway; positive regulation of macrophage cytokine production; positive regulation of interleukin-10 production; immune system process; astrocyte development; intestinal epithelial structure maintenance; positive regulation of nucleotide-binding oligomerization domain containing 1 signaling pathway; response to lipopolysaccharide; cellular response to lipoteichoic acid; positive regulation of NF-kappaB transcription factor activity; immune response; negative regulation of interleukin-23 production; regulation of inflammatory response; positive regulation of chemokine production; lipopolysaccharide-mediated signaling pathway; detection of fungus; positive regulation of nucleotide-binding oligomerization domain containing 2 signaling pathway; negative regulation of interferon-gamma production; response to bacterium; negative regulation of osteoclast differentiation; B cell proliferation involved in immune response; positive regulation of nitric oxide biosynthetic process; negative regulation of interleukin-6 production; positive regulation of interferon-gamma production; nitric oxide production involved in inflammatory response; MyD88-dependent toll-like receptor signaling pathway; regulation of dendritic cell cytokine production; positive regulation of gene expression; negative regulation of ERK1 and ERK2 cascade; positive regulation of I-kappaB kinase/NF-kappaB signaling; macrophage activation; detection of lipopolysaccharide; cellular response to lipopolysaccharide; positive regulation of lymphocyte proliferation; positive regulation of transcription by RNA polymerase II; MyD88-independent toll-like receptor signaling pathway; signal transduction; inflammatory response; defense response to Gram-negative bacterium; toll-like receptor signaling pathway; necroptosis; apoptotic signaling pathway; negative regulation of MyD88-independent toll-like receptor signaling pathway
Sources:Amigo / QuickGO
Orthologs
Databases	NCBI: entry; OMA: entry
Species	Human	Mouse
Entrez	7099	21898
Ensembl	ENSG00000136869	ENSMUSG00000039005
UniProt	O00206	Q9QUK6
RefSeq (mRNA)	NM_138557; NM_003266; NM_138554; NM_138556	NM_021297
RefSeq (protein)	NP_003257; NP_612564; NP_612567	NP_067272
Location (UCSC)	Chr 9: 117.7 – 117.72 Mb	Chr 4: 66.75 – 66.85 Mb
PubMed search
- Wikidata
View/Edit Human	View/Edit Mouse

Toll-like receptor 4 (TLR4), also designated as CD284 (cluster of differentiation 284), is a key activator of the innate immune response and plays a central role in the fight against bacterial infections. TLR4 is a transmembrane protein of approximately 95 kDa that is encoded by the TLR4 gene.

TLR4 belongs to the toll-like receptor family which is representative of the pattern recognition receptors (PRR), so named for their ability to recognize evolutionarily conserved components of microorganisms (bacteria, viruses, fungi and parasites) called pathogen-associated molecular patterns (PAMPs). The recognition of a PAMP by a PRR triggers rapid activation of the innate immunity essential to fight infectious diseases.

TLR4 is expressed in immune cells mainly of myeloid origin, including monocytes, macrophages and dendritic cells (DC). It is also expressed at a lower level on some non-immune cells, including epithelium, endothelium, placental cells and beta cells in Langerhans islets. Most myeloid cells express also high amounts of plasma membrane-anchored CD14, which facilitates the activation of TLR4 by LPS and controls the subsequent internalization of the LPS-activated TLR4 important for receptor signaling and degradation.

The main ligands for TLR4 are lipopolysaccharides (LPS), the major components of the outer membrane of Gram-negative bacteria and some Gram-positive bacteria. TLR4 can also be activated by endogenous compounds called damage-associated molecular patterns (DAMPs), including high mobility group box protein 1 (HMGB1), S100 proteins, or histones. These compounds are released during tissue injury and by dying or necrotic cells.

== Function ==
The first function described for TLR4 was the recognition of exogenous molecules from pathogens (PAMPs), in particular LPS molecules from gram-negative bacteria. As pattern recognition receptor, TLR4 plays a fundamental role in pathogen recognition and activation of innate immunity which is the first line of defense against invading micro-organisms. During infection, TLR4 responds to the LPS present in tissues and the bloodstream and triggers pro-inflammatory reactions facilitating eradication of the invading bacteria.

TLR4 is also involved in the recognition of endogenous DAMP molecules leading to different signaling outcomes than PAMPs, both quantitatively and qualitatively. DAMPs can activate TLR4 in non-infectious conditions to induce tissue repair and the activation of mainly proinflammatory responses. Generally, inflammation has a protective role. It is a complex and coordinated process followed by the induction of resolution pathways that restore tissue integrity and function. However, in some cases, an excessive and/or poorly regulated inflammatory response to DAMPs can be detrimental to the organism, accelerating the development or progression of pathologies such as a number of cancers and neurodegenerative diseases (as discussed below).

TLR4 binds LPS with the help of LPS-binding protein (LBP) and CD14, and an indispensable contribution of the MD-2 protein stably associated with the extracellular fragment of the receptor. TLR4 signaling responds to signals by forming a complex using an extracellular leucine-rich repeat domain (LRR) and an intracellular toll/interleukin-1 receptor (TIR) domain. LPS stimulation induces a series of interactions with several accessory proteins which form the TLR4 complex on the cell surface. LPS recognition is initiated by an LPS binding to an LBP. This LPS-LBP complex transfers the LPS to CD14 which is a glycosylphosphatidylinositol-anchored membrane protein that binds the LPS-LBP complex and facilitates the transfer of LPS to MD-2 protein, which is associated with the extracellular domain of TLR4. LPS binding promotes the dimerization of TLR4/MD-2 complex. The conformational changes of the TLR4 induce the recruitment of intracellular adaptor proteins containing the TIR domain which is necessary to activate the downstream signaling pathway.

The binding of an LPS molecule to the TLR4/MD-2 complex involves acyl chains and phosphate groups of lipid A, the conserved part of LPS and the main inducer of pro-inflammatory responses to LPS.

TLR4 activation and response to LPS is greatly influenced by the polysaccharide domain and the molecular structure of Lipid A moiety of the LPS molecules. Hexa-acylated and diphosphorylated LPS, like Escherichia coli LPS (O111:B4), is one of the most potent agonists of TLR4 whereas under-acylated LPS and dephosphorylated LPS species have a weaker pro-inflammatory activity especially in human cells. Structural determinants of this phenomenon are found in the TLR4/MD-2 complex and also in CD14 protein. The polysaccharide portion covalently bound to lipid A also plays an indispensable role in TLR4 activation through CD14/TLR4/MD-2. However, in addition to the lipid A domain, the polysaccharide moiety plays an important role in the binding and activation of the LPS molecules as the lipid A moiety alone was demonstrated to be significantly less active than the full LPS molecule.

== Signaling ==
Unlike all the other TLRs, TLR4 stimulation triggers two signaling pathways called the MyD88-dependent and the TRIF-dependent one after the adaptor proteins involved in their induction. The MyD88-dependent signaling is triggered by TLR4 localized to the plasma membrane, while the TRIF-dependent one by the TLR4 internalized in endosomes.

These signaling pathways lead to the production of two sets of cytokines. The MyD88-dependent pathway induces the production of pro-inflammatory cytokines while TRIF-dependent pathway induces the production of type I interferons and chemokines. The molecular structure of TLR4 ligands (in particular LPS), as well as their complexation with proteins or lipids, greatly influence the action of these TLR4-related signaling pathways, leading to different cytokine balances.

MyD88 and TRIF dependent signaling pathway of TLR4.

=== MyD88 – dependent pathway ===
The MyD88-dependent pathway is regulated by two adaptor-associated proteins: Myeloid Differentiation Primary Response Gene 88 (MyD88) and TIR Domain-Containing Adaptor Protein (TIRAP). It also involves the activation of IL-1 Receptor-Associated Kinases (IRAKs) and the adaptor molecules TNF Receptor-Associated Factor 6 (TRAF6). TRAF6 induces the activation of TAK1 (Transforming growth factor-β-Activated Kinase 1) that leads to the activation of MAPK cascades (Mitogen-Activated Protein Kinase) and the IκB Kinases (IKK), called IKKα and IKKβ. IKKs' signaling pathway leads to the induction of the transcription factor NF-κB, while activation of MAPK cascades lead to the activation of another transcription factor AP-1. These two transcription factors induce the expression of genes encoding pro-inflammatory mediators, such as tumor necrosis factor α (TNF-α), interleukin (IL)-6, and type III interferons (IFNλ1/2).

=== TRIF – dependent pathway ===
The TRIF-dependent pathway involves the internalization of TLR4 in endosomes and the recruitment of the adaptor proteins TIR-domain-containing adaptor inducing interferon-β (TRIF) and TRIF-related Adaptor Molecule (TRAM). TRAM-TRIF signals activate the ubiquitin ligase TRAF3 followed by the activation of non-canonical IKK kinases: TANK binding kinase 1 (TBK1) and IKKε. TBK1 phosphorylates the pLxIS consensus motif of TRIF that is necessary to recruit interferon regulatory factor (IRF) 3. IRF3 is also phosphorylated by TBK1 and then dissociates from TRIF, dimerizes and translocates to the nucleus. Finally, IRF3 induces the expression of genes encoding type I IFN such as interferon beta (IFN-β), the chemokine CCL5/ RANTES and interferon-regulated genes as that encoding the chemokine CXCL10/IP-10. TRIF-dependent signaling pathway of TLR4 is known to play a central role in the stimulation of innate immune cells such as macrophages, the maturation of DCs and the induction and recruitment of Th1 adaptive immune responses.

== Immune cell activation ==
TLR4 activation by LPS enables a rapid stimulation of a wide range of innate immune cells such as macrophages and DCs. This leads to the secretion of pro-inflammatory and type I interferons cytokines, chemokines. Production levels of these cytokines/chemokines vary according to the degree of activation of the MyD88 and TRIF signaling pathways by TLR4 agonist molecules. TLR4 activation also induces the stimulation of antigen presentation and upregulation of costimulatory molecules (such as CD40, CD80 and CD86) on innate immune cells which are required for antigen presentation for T lymphocytes. This explains why TLR4 activation by LPS is also known to stimulate the generation of effective adaptive immune responses and to induce their recruitment, polarization and maintenance via the panel of cytokines and chemokines produced.

The TRIF and MyD88 signaling pathways have a different but complementary impact on immune cell activation. Macrophage stimulation has been shown to be strictly dependent on TRIF pathway activation whereas DC activation and maturation depend on both the MyD88 and TRIF pathways. The increased expression of costimulatory and MHC molecules is a hallmark of DC maturation required for antigen presentation by these cells. However, significant differences were found in the signaling pathways leading to this phenomenon. In macrophages, the upregulation of costimulatory molecules depends strictly on the TRIF-dependent pathway, whereas in DC both the MyD88- and TRIF-dependent ones are involved. The increased cell surface presence of the costimulatory molecules and also of MHC II is a hallmark of DC maturation required for antigen presentation by these cells.

The activation of MyD88 and TRIF signaling pathways were also found to induce Th1 polarization of the T cells responses through DC maturation and the panel of cytokines produced. Low activation of MYD88 pathway is however important for effective cytotoxic T-cell differentiation by facilitating fusion of MHC I-bearing recycling endosomes with phagosomes allowing cross-presentation of antigens. In contrast, robust activation of MYD88 pathway induces excessive production of pro-inflammatory cytokines leading to life-threatening pathological consequences such as cytokine storms.

The impact of TLR4 activation on the innate and adaptive immune system explains why TLR4 agonists, such as LPS derivatives, have been developed as vaccine adjuvants. Among them is GSK's Monophosphorylated Lipid A (MPL), a detoxified Lipid A derived from Salmonella LPS, which is the first and only natural immunostimulant to have been approved as adjuvant in five human vaccines.

== Evolutionary history and polymorphism ==
TLR4 originated when TLR2 and TLR4 diverged about 500 million years ago near the beginning of vertebrate evolution. Sequence alignments of human and great ape TLR4 exons have demonstrated that not much evolution has occurred in human TLR4 since our divergence from our last common ancestor with chimpanzees; human and chimp TLR4 exons only differ by three substitutions while humans and baboons are 93.5% similar in the extracellular domain. Notably, humans possess a greater number of early stop codons in TLR4 than great apes; in a study of 158 humans worldwide, 0.6% had a nonsense mutation. This suggests that there are weaker evolutionary pressures on the human TLR4 than on our primate relatives. The distribution of human TLR4 polymorphisms matches the out-of-Africa migration, and it is likely that the polymorphisms were generated in Africa before migration to other continents.

Various single nucleotide polymorphisms (SNPs) of TLR4 have been identified in humans. For some of them, an association with increased susceptibility to Gram-negative bacterial infections or faster progression and a more severe course of sepsis in critically ill patients was reported.However, they are very rare, and their frequency varies according to ethnic origin. The 2 predominant SNPs are Asp299Gly and Thr399Ile, with a frequency of <10% in the Caucasian population and even lower in the Asian population. These two SNPs are missense mutations, thus associated with a loss of function, which may explain their negative impact on infection control. Studies have indeed shown that TLR4 D299G SNP limits the response to LPS by compromising MyD88 and TRIF recruitment to TLR4, and thus cytokine secretion, but without affecting TLR4 expression Structural analyses of human TLR4 with SNP D299G suggest that this amino acid change affects van der Waals interaction and hydrogen bonding in leucine-rich repeats, modulating its surface properties which may affect LPS ligand binding to TLR4.

== Clinical significance ==
TLR4 has been reported to play both friend and foe in a variety of human diseases, such as bacterial infections and cancers. This dual role of TLR4 depends on the intensity, duration and site (surface or endosome) of its activation, its polymorphism and the balance of activation of signaling pathways (MyD88 vs. TRIF).

=== Infectious diseases ===
TLR4 play a central role in the control of bacterial infections through the recognition of LPS molecules from gram-negative, and some gram-positive, bacteria. During infections, TLR4s on innate immunity cells are activated by LPS molecules present in tissues and the bloodstream. This activates innate immunity, the first line of defense against invading microorganisms, and triggers pro-inflammatory responses that facilitate the eradication of invading bacteria. Generally, inflammation has a protective role. It is a complex and coordinated process followed by the induction of resolution pathways that restore tissue integrity and function. However, in some cases, exaggerated and uncontrolled inflammation triggered by TLR4 during infection can lead to sepsis and septic shock. Infections with Gram-negative bacteria such as Escherichia coli and Pseudomonas aeruginosa are the prevailing causes of severe sepsis in humans. Some studies have linked TLR4 polymorphisms (Asp299Gly and Thr399Ile SNPs) to an increased susceptibility to sepsis due to gram-negative infection but other studies failed to confirm this.

=== Cancer ===
The role of the TLR4 in the control of cancer progression and in cancer therapy is well documented.

Stimulation of TLR4 by natural derivatives and LPS is well known to induce potent antitumor activity. This anti-tumor activity is linked to the ability of LPS to stimulate innate immunity via TLR4, resulting in the production of pro-inflammatory cytokines and type 1 interferons, and the indirect generation of adaptive anti-tumor responses.

The first clues about the efficacy of TLR4 agonists like LPS in cancer immunotherapy was found in the 19th centuries, when bacterial infections were found to induce tumor regressions. Later, Dr William Coley showed the therapeutic efficacy of a mixed bacterial vaccine, so-called "Coley's toxin", to human cancer. Since then, a number of developments have been made in the treatment or prevention of cancer using bacterial mixtures strongly activating TLR4 due to LPS content. The antituberculosis vaccine Bacillus Calmette–Guérin (BCG) was approved by the Federal Drug Administration (FDA) in 1990 for the local treatment of superficial bladder cancer. BCG promotes dendritic cell maturation, and this effect is TLR4 (as well as TLR2) dependent. There are also reports on the treatment of oral squamous cell carcinoma, gastric, Head-and-neck and cervical cancers with lyophilized streptococcal preparation OK-432 (Picibanil). The mechanism of action of OK-432 involves TLR4 activation, since OKA-432 does not inhibit tumor growth on TLR4 knockouts as it does on wild-type mice.

Purified LPS also showed potent anti-tumor efficacy as systemic therapeutic agents in several tumor models. In the 90's, clinical trials evaluating the intravenous administration of LPS to patients with cancer provided positive results including several cases of disease stabilization and partial responses. However, limiting toxicities at doses in the ng/kg range has been reported which are too low to obtain significant antitumor effects.

Subsequently, detoxified TLR4 agonists (LPS derivatives) have been produced and evaluated in the clinic. This includes the MPL, a chemically modified LPS which was the first TLR4 agonist to be approved and commercialized by GSK in 5 human vaccines (HPV, Zoster, Hepatitis B, Malaria, RSV). MPL was investigated as an adjuvant for curative anti-tumor vaccines, with the approval of Melacine in Canada for the treatment of patients with melanoma. Synthetic LPS derivatives based on dephosphorylated lipid A moiety structures were also developed and confirmed potent adjuvant and antitumor activities as therapeutic agents. In particular, the intratumoral administration of Glucopyranosyl Lipid Adjuvant (GLA-SE/G100), a synthetic detoxified analog of lipid A formulated in a stable emulsion, showed anti-tumor immune responses and tumor regression in patients with Merkel cell carcinoma, and potent adjuvant activity in phase 2 trials in combination with pembrolizumab in patients with follicular lymphoma.

Besides the recognized anti-tumor efficacy of TLR4 activation by LPS, some studies suggest that TLR4 may also contribute to the development of some cancers, (prostate, liver, breast and lung cancers) and may contribute to resistance to paclitaxel chemotherapy in breast cancer. Some clinical studies also suggested a potential correlation between TLR4 expression on tumor cells and tumor progression. However, no such effect was reported in the numerous clinical studies conducted with natural LPS or LPS derivatives. On the contrary, in phase 2 studies with GLA, a positive association between baseline TLR4 expression in tumors and the increase of overall response rates has been reported.

The potential impact of TLR4 on the progression of some cancers was associated with the excessive production of pro-inflammatory cytokines via activation of the TLR4-MyD88/NF-kB signaling pathway. Several studies showed that this is mediated by the misuse of DAMP signaling by tumor cells.

Many DAMPs are released by dying or necrotic tumor cells and present during cancer progression. DAMPs released from tumor cells can directly activate tumor-expressed TLR4 that induce chemoresistance, migration, invasion, and metastasis. Furthermore, DAMP-induced chronic inflammation in the tumor microenvironment causes an increase in immunosuppressive populations, such as M2 macrophages, myeloid-derived suppressor cells (MDSCs), and regulatory T cells (Tregs). DAMPs, such as HMGB1, S100 proteins, and heat shock proteins (HSPs), were found to strongly activate inflammatory pathways and release IL-1, IL-6, LT-β, IFN-γ, TNF, and transforming growth factor (TGF)-β promoting inflammation, immunosuppression, angiogenesis, and tumor cell proliferation.

Several studies have evaluated the potential association of this TLR4 polymorphism with cancer risk, but the data are highly conflicting. However, some meta-analyses suggest an association of SNP D299G with gastric, viral-induced and female-specific cancers (cervix, ovary).

=== Neurogenerative diseases ===
Growing evidence suggests an implication of TLR4 in the development and progression of neurogenerative disorders such as Alzheimer's disease, Parkinson's disease, and Huntington's disease. In the brain, TLR4 is expressed by neurons as well as the non-neuronal glial cells, which include microglia, astrocytes, and oligodendrocytes. TLR4 is expressed primarily by microglia, and to a lesser extent by astrocytes, oligodendrocytes, and neurons. Microglia are representatives of the mononuclear phagocyte system in the brain, and TLR4 activation regulates some of their functions, such as phagocytic activity.

Activation of microglial TLR4 has been suggested to protect against or slow the development of neurodegenerative diseases, notably by enhancing the clearance of neurotoxic proteins such as Aβ and its aggregates, thanks to increased phagocytic and autophagic activity.

However, chronic TLR4 activation is believed to be associated with glia-mediated neuronal death due to excessive secretion of pro-inflammatory cytotoxins leading to neuroinflammation, a key factor in the development of many neurodegenerative diseases. In the brain, TLR4 can be activated by various endogenous DAMPs in addition to pathology-associated proteins such as aggregates of amyloid-βpeptides (Aβ) or α-synuclein. All these structures bind TLR4 and activate downstream signaling pathways in glia, inducing secretion of reactive oxygen species (ROS) and proinflammatory cytokines such as IL-1β and TNF-α, which can lead to damage and death of neurons. Neuronal death is accompanied by the release of DAMPs into the extracellular space, which can then further activate TLR4, aggravating neuroinflammation. In patients with Alzheimer's disease (AD), the levels of circulating DAMPs like HMGB1 and soluble RAGE, are significantly elevated, which was correlated with the levels of amyloid beta. In AD patients, the serum levels of S100B are also intimately related to the severity of the disease. The role of the HMGB1-TLR4 axis is very important in the pathogenesis of Parkinson's disease (PD). The serum HMGB1 and TLR4 protein levels were significantly elevated in PD patients and correlated with the PD stages.

Targeting TLR4 with agonists or antagonists, or modulating its downstream signaling pathways, may have a therapeutic potential in treating neurodegenerative diseases. TLR4-specific antagonists could suppress neuroinflammation by reducing overproduction of inflammatory mediators and cytotoxins by glia. However, TLR4 antagonists could have adverse CNS effects by inhibiting phagocytosis by glia, reducing protein clearance, and interfering with myelination. Some studies showed that selective TLR4 agonists could be beneficial by upregulating the phagocytic activity of microglia, leading to enhanced clearance of damaged tissue and abnormal protein aggregates associated with several different CNS diseases. Repeated injections of MPL, at doses that are nonpyrogenic, were found to significantly improved AD-related pathology mice. MPL led to a significant reduction in Aβ load in the brain, as well as enhanced cognitive function. MPL induced a potent phagocytic response by microglia while triggering a moderate inflammatory reaction. However, adverse effects can be caused by TLR 4 agonists inducing secretion of inflammatory mediators. Studies therefore suggested that TLR4 agonists that selectively activate the TRIF signaling pathway could be highly beneficial in the treatment of neurodegenerative disorders by increasing glial cell phagocytic activity without significantly increasing glial cytokines and cytotoxins.

== Drugs targeting TLR4 ==
=== Opioids ===
TLR4 has been shown to be important for the long-term side-effects of opioid analgesic drugs. Various μ-opioid receptor ligands have been tested and found to also possess action as agonists or antagonists of TLR4, with opioid agonists such as (+)-morphine being TLR4 agonists, while opioid antagonists such as naloxone were found to be TLR4 antagonists. Activation of TLR4 leads to downstream release of inflammatory modulators including TNF-α and Interleukin-1, and constant low-level release of these modulators is thought to reduce the efficacy of opioid drug treatment with time, and be involved in both the development of tolerance to opioid analgesic drugs, and in the emergence of side-effects such as hyperalgesia and allodynia that can become a problem following extended use of opioid drugs. Drugs that block the action of TNF-α or IL-1β have been shown to increase the analgesic effects of opioids and reduce the development of tolerance and other side-effects, and this has also been demonstrated with drugs that block TLR4 itself.

The response of TLR4 to opioid drugs has been found to be enantiomer-independent, so the "unnatural" enantiomers of opioid drugs such as (-)-morphine and (+)-naloxone, which lack affinity for opioid receptors, still produce the same activity at TLR4 as their "normal" enantiomers. This means that the unnatural enantiomers of opioid antagonists, such as (+)-naloxone, can be used to block the TLR4 activity of opioid analgesic drugs, while leaving the μ-opioid receptor mediated analgesic activity unaffected. This may also be the mechanism behind the beneficial effect of ultra-low dose naltrexone on opioid analgesia.

Morphine causes inflammation by binding to the protein lymphocyte antigen 96, which, in turn, causes the protein to bind to Toll-like receptor 4 (TLR4). The morphine-induced TLR4 activation attenuates pain suppression by opioids and enhances the development of opioid tolerance and addiction, drug abuse, and other negative side effects such as respiratory depression and hyperalgesia. Drug candidates that target TLR4 may improve opioid-based pain management therapies.

=== Agonists ===
Apart from LPS and its derivatives, up to 30 natural TLR4 agonists with diverse chemical structures have been postulated. Most of them are PAMPs or DAMPs. However, besides LPS (and lipid A), paclitaxel, and Ni^{2+}, the others have not demonstrated to be direct activators of TLR4 and could instead act as chaperones for TLR4 or as promoters of LPS internalization. Further experiments should try to test whether the proposed agonists satisfy three postulates: that the activation depends on the existence of TLR4 and MD-2, that the test environment is not contaminated by other agonists such as LPS, and that the substance in question forms a novel molecular interaction with TLR4/MD-2 as the "ultimate proof". TLR4/MD-2 from different species may also interact differently with proposed ligands. For example, paclitaxel is a confirmed direct TLR4/MD-2 agonist in mice, but acts as an antagonist in humans. Ni^{2+} causes confirmed activation in humans (an explanation of nickle-associated contact dermatitis) but not in mice.

It is unclear whether opioids act as true agonists. As of 2021, molecular docking computations suggest a possible interaction at the LPS binding site of MD-2, but the way opioids modify LPS-induced interaction suggest instead a noncompetitve action at a different site.

=== Antagonists ===
As of 2020, there were no specific TLR4 antagonists approved as drugs.

- Amitriptyline
- Cyclobenzaprine
- CyRL-QN15
- Eritoran
- Ketotifen
- Imipramine
- Mianserin
- Ibudilast
- Pinocembrin
- Resatorvid
- M62812
- Naloxone
- (+)-Naloxone ("unnatural" isomer, lacks opioid receptor affinity so selective for TLR4 inhibition)
- Naltrexone
- (+)-Naltrexone
- LPS-RS
- Propentofylline
- Pentoxifylline (and downregulate TLR4 expression)
- Tapentadol (mixed agonist/antagonist)
- TLR4-IN-C34
- Palmitoylethanolamide
