= Lymphocyte antigen 96 =

Protein-coding gene in the species Homo sapiens

LY96
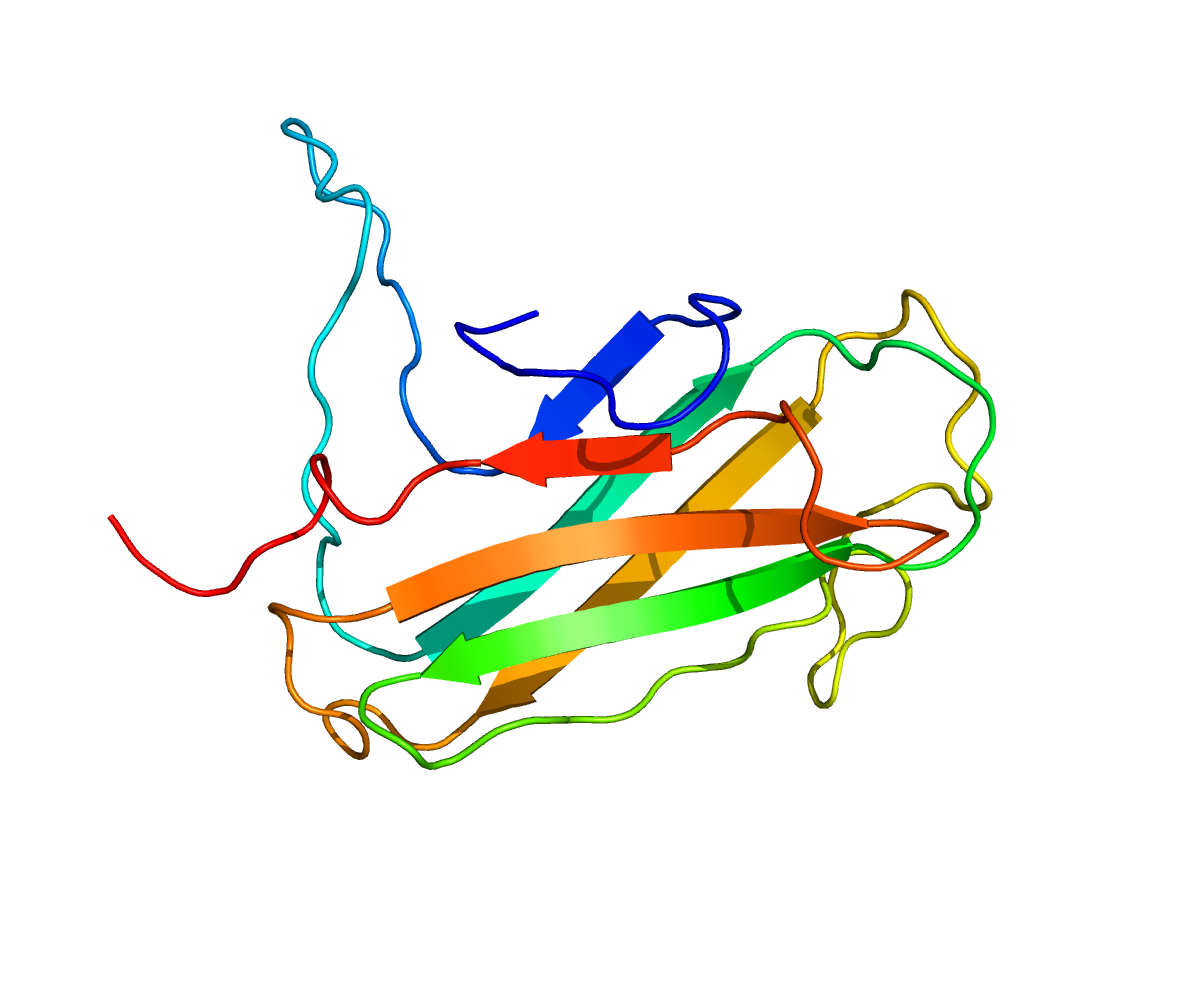
Available structures
PDB	Ortholog search: PDBe RCSB
PDB	List of PDB id codes 2E56, 2E59, 2Z65, 3FXI, 3ULA, 4G8A

Identifiers
- Aliases: LY96, ESOP-1, MD-2, MD2, ly-96, lymphocyte antigen 96
- External IDs: OMIM: 605243; MGI: 1341909; HomoloGene: 9109; GeneCards: LY96; OMA:LY96 - orthologs

Gene location (Human)
Chr.	Chromosome 8 (human)
Band	8q21.11	Start	73,991,392 bp
Band	8q21.11	End	74,029,079 bp

Gene location (Mouse)
Chr.	Chromosome 1 (mouse)
Band	1|1 A3	Start	16,758,275 bp
Band	1|1 A3	End	16,779,835 bp
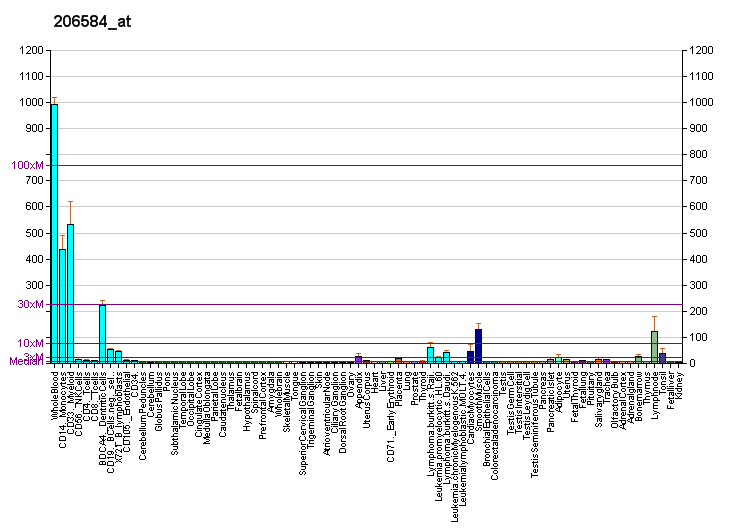
RNA expression pattern
Bgee	Human / Mouse (ortholog); Top expressed in: monocyte; periodontal fiber; granulocyte; spleen; testicle; appendix; lymph node; gallbladder; decidua; trabecular bone / Top expressed in: blastocyst; granulocyte; morula; right kidney; zygote; seminal vesicula; parotid gland; epithelium of small intestine; proximal tubule; embryo; More reference expression data
BioGPS	More reference expression data
Gene ontology
Molecular function	coreceptor activity; protein binding; lipopolysaccharide immune receptor activity; lipopolysaccharide binding; Toll-like receptor 4 binding
Cellular component	intrinsic component of plasma membrane; plasma membrane; extracellular region; lipopolysaccharide receptor complex; endosome membrane; extracellular space
Biological process	toll-like receptor 4 signaling pathway; immune system process; MyD88-dependent toll-like receptor signaling pathway; positive regulation of lipopolysaccharide-mediated signaling pathway; TRIF-dependent toll-like receptor signaling pathway; cellular defense response; cell surface receptor signaling pathway; response to lipopolysaccharide; positive regulation of tumor necrosis factor production; inflammatory response; cellular response to lipopolysaccharide; detection of lipopolysaccharide; I-kappaB kinase/NF-kappaB signaling; MyD88-independent toll-like receptor signaling pathway; lipopolysaccharide-mediated signaling pathway; negative regulation of MyD88-independent toll-like receptor signaling pathway; innate immune response; necroptosis; apoptotic signaling pathway; toll-like receptor signaling pathway
Sources:Amigo / QuickGO
Orthologs
Species	Human	Mouse
Entrez	23643	17087
Ensembl	ENSG00000154589	ENSMUSG00000025779
UniProt	Q9Y6Y9	Q9JHF9
RefSeq (mRNA)	NM_001195797; NM_015364	NM_001159711; NM_016923
RefSeq (protein)	NP_001182726; NP_056179	NP_001153183; NP_058619
Location (UCSC)	Chr 8: 73.99 – 74.03 Mb	Chr 1: 16.76 – 16.78 Mb
PubMed search
- Wikidata
View/Edit Human	View/Edit Mouse

Lymphocyte antigen 96, also known as "Myeloid Differentiation factor 2 (MD-2)," is a protein that in humans is encoded by the LY96 gene.

The protein encoded by this gene is involved in binding lipopolysaccharide with Toll-Like Receptor (TLR4).

== Function ==
The MD-2 protein appears to associate with toll-like receptor 4 on the cell surface and confers responsiveness to lipopolysaccharide (LPS), thus providing a link between the receptor and LPS signaling. That is, the primary interface between TLR4 and MD-2 is formed before binding LPS and the dimerization interface is induced by binding LPS.

== Structure ==
MD-2 has a β-cup fold structure composed of two anti-parallel β sheets forming a large hydrophobic pocket for ligand binding.

== Interactions ==
Lymphocyte antigen 96 has been shown to interact with TLR 4.

When LPS binds to a hydrophobic pocket in MD-2, it directly mediates dimerization of the two TLR4-MD-2 complexes. Thus, TLR4 and MD-2 form a heterodimer that recognizes a common pattern in structurally diverse LPS molecules. These interactions allow TLR4 to recognize LPS. Macrophages in MD-2 knockout mice are unresponsive to LPS.

LPS is extracted from the bacterial membrane and transferred to TLR4-MD-2 by two accessory proteins, LPS-binding protein and CD14, to induce innate immune response.
