= CD14 =

Mammalian protein found in humans

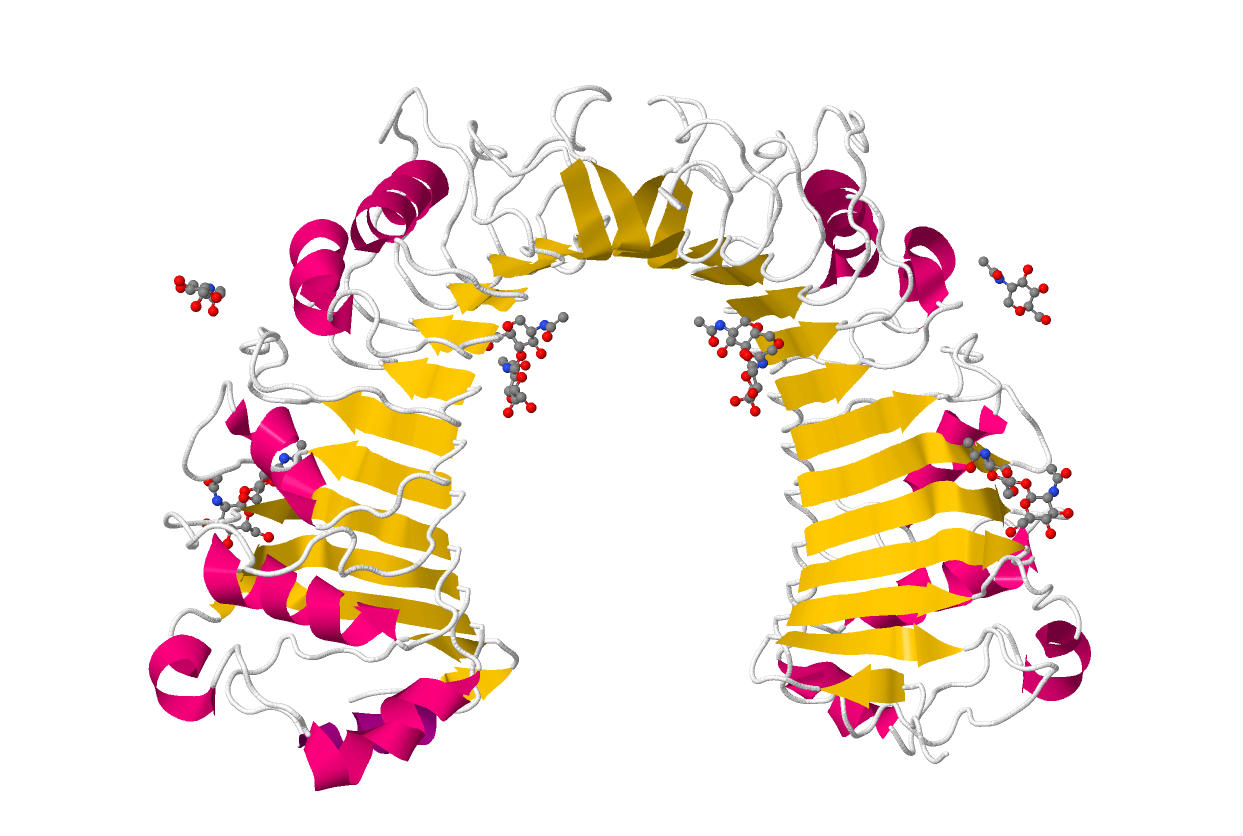

Identifiers
- Aliases: CD14, entrez:929, CD14 molecule
- External IDs: OMIM: 158120; MGI: 88318; GeneCards: CD14
Available structures
PDB	Ortholog search: PDBe RCSB
PDB	List of PDB id codes 4GLP

Gene location (Human)
Chr.	Chromosome 5 (human)
Band	5q31.3	Start	140,631,728 bp
Band	5q31.3	End	140,633,700 bp

Gene location (Mouse)
Chr.	Chromosome 18 (mouse)
Band	18 B2|18 19.46 cM	Start	36,858,120 bp
Band	18 B2|18 19.46 cM	End	36,859,851 bp
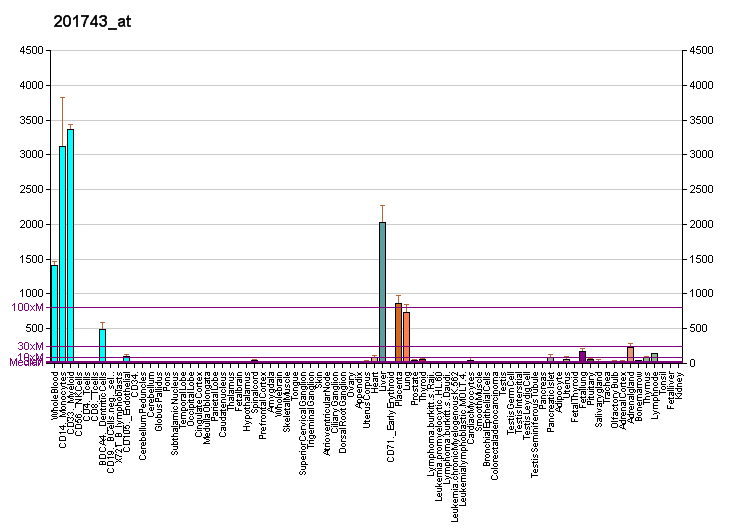
RNA expression pattern
Bgee	Human / Mouse (ortholog); Top expressed in: monocyte; granulocyte; right lobe of liver; right coronary artery; blood; left adrenal gland; left adrenal cortex; right adrenal gland; synovial joint; gallbladder / Top expressed in: lactiferous gland; granulocyte; ankle joint; stroma of bone marrow; endothelial cell of lymphatic vessel; Ileal epithelium; cervix; right lung lobe; left colon; submandibular gland; More reference expression data
BioGPS	More reference expression data
Gene ontology
Molecular function	lipopolysaccharide binding; opsonin receptor activity; lipoteichoic acid binding; protein binding; peptidoglycan immune receptor activity; lipopeptide binding
Cellular component	Golgi apparatus; membrane; plasma membrane; extracellular region; cell surface; lipopolysaccharide receptor complex; anchored component of external side of plasma membrane; membrane raft; anchored component of membrane; endosome membrane; extracellular exosome; external side of plasma membrane; extracellular space; secretory granule membrane
Biological process	toll-like receptor TLR1:TLR2 signaling pathway; response to bacterium; toll-like receptor 4 signaling pathway; immune system process; cellular response to diacyl bacterial lipopeptide; positive regulation of interferon-gamma production; response to magnesium ion; response to heat; response to electrical stimulus; MyD88-dependent toll-like receptor signaling pathway; receptor-mediated endocytosis; cellular response to triacyl bacterial lipopeptide; TRIF-dependent toll-like receptor signaling pathway; response to tumor necrosis factor; positive regulation of endocytosis; cell surface receptor signaling pathway; response to lipopolysaccharide; cellular response to lipoteichoic acid; phagocytosis; positive regulation of tumor necrosis factor production; inflammatory response; response to ethanol; I-kappaB kinase/NF-kappaB signaling; toll-like receptor TLR6:TLR2 signaling pathway; cellular response to lipopolysaccharide; response to molecule of bacterial origin; positive regulation of type I interferon production; lipopolysaccharide-mediated signaling pathway; MyD88-independent toll-like receptor signaling pathway; apoptotic process; innate immune response; necroptosis; negative regulation of MyD88-independent toll-like receptor signaling pathway; apoptotic signaling pathway; toll-like receptor signaling pathway; neutrophil degranulation; positive regulation of NIK/NF-kappaB signaling
Sources:Amigo / QuickGO
Orthologs
Databases	NCBI: entry; OMA: entry
Species	Human	Mouse
Entrez	929	12475
Ensembl	ENSG00000170458	ENSMUSG00000051439
UniProt	P08571	P10810
RefSeq (mRNA)	NM_001174105; NM_000591; NM_001040021; NM_001174104	NM_009841
RefSeq (protein)	NP_000582; NP_001035110; NP_001167575; NP_001167576	NP_033971
Location (UCSC)	Chr 5: 140.63 – 140.63 Mb	Chr 18: 36.86 – 36.86 Mb
PubMed search
- Wikidata
View/Edit Human	View/Edit Mouse

CD14 (cluster of differentiation 14) is a surface membrane protein made mostly by macrophages as part of the innate immune system. It helps to detect bacteria in the body by binding lipopolysaccharide (LPS), a pathogen-associated molecular pattern (PAMP). It is highly expressed on monocytes and macrophages, and at lower levels on neutrophils and dendritic cells.

CD14 exists in two forms, one anchored to the membrane by a glycosylphosphatidylinositol (GPI) tail (mCD14), the other a soluble form (sCD14). Soluble CD14 either appears after shedding of mCD14 (48 kDa) or is directly secreted from intracellular vesicles (56 kDa).

The x-ray crystal structure of human CD14 reveals a monomeric, bent solenoid structure containing a hydrophobic amino-terminal pocket.

== Function ==
CD14 acts as a co-receptor (along with the Toll-like receptor TLR 4 and MD-2) for the detection of bacterial lipopolysaccharide (LPS). CD14 can bind LPS only in the presence of lipopolysaccharide-binding protein (LBP). Although LPS is considered its main ligand, CD14 also recognizes other pathogen-associated molecular patterns such as lipoteichoic acid. Cluster of differentiation CD14 is a receptor for a very wide range of microbial products including lipopolysaccharide (released from Gram-negative bacteria), peptidoglycans, and lipoteichoic acid (constituents of Gram-positive bacteria).

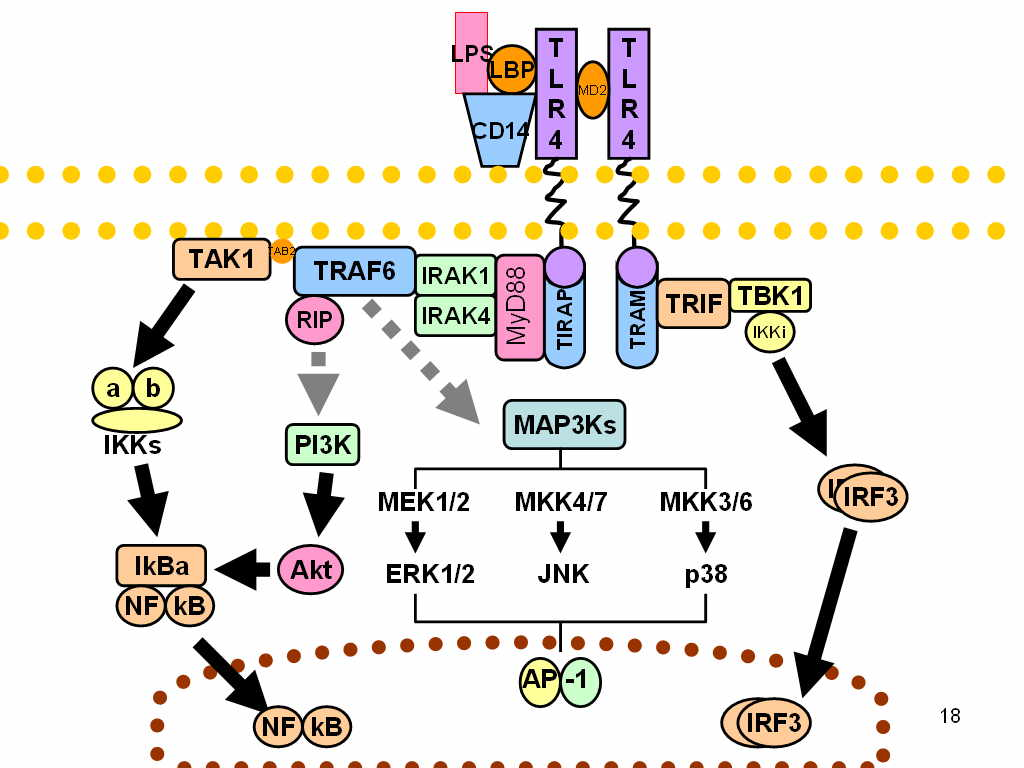
Signaling pathway of toll-like receptors. Dashed grey lines represent unknown associations

== Tissue distribution ==
CD14 is expressed mainly by macrophages and (at 10-times lesser extent) by neutrophils. It is also expressed by dendritic cells. The soluble form of the receptor (sCD14) is secreted by the liver and monocytes and is sufficient in low concentrations to confer LPS-responsiveness to cells not expressing CD14. mCD14 and sCD14 are also present on enterocytes. sCD14 is also present in human milk, where it is believed to regulate microbial growth in the infant gut.

== Differentiation ==
CD14+ monocytes can differentiate into a host of different cells, including dendritic cells, a differentiation pathway encouraged by cytokines, including GM-CSF and IL-4.

== Interactions ==
CD14 has been shown to interact with lipopolysaccharide-binding protein.
