= BPIFB9P =

Pseudogene in the species Homo sapiens

Identifiers
- Aliases: BPIFB9P, C20orf115, dJ1187J4.2, dJ1187J4.3, BPI fold containing family B member 9, pseudogene
- External IDs: GeneCards: BPIFB9P

Gene location (Human)
Chr.	Chromosome 20 (human)
Band	20q11.21	Start	33,347,720 bp
Band	20q11.21	End	33,354,444 bp
RNA expression pattern
Bgee	Human / Mouse (ortholog); Top expressed in: right hemisphere of cerebellum; right frontal lobe; Brodmann area 9; anterior cingulate cortex; muscle of thigh; gastrocnemius muscle; nucleus accumbens; putamen; hypothalamus; apex of heart / n/a; More reference expression data
BioGPS	n/a
Orthologs
Databases	NCBI: entry; OMA: entry
Species	Human	Mouse
Entrez	402016	n/a
Ensembl	ENSG00000125997	n/a
UniProt	n a	n/a
RefSeq (mRNA)	n/a	n/a
RefSeq (protein)	n/a	n/a
Location (UCSC)	Chr 20: 33.35 – 33.35 Mb	n/a
PubMed search		n/a
- Wikidata
View/Edit Human

Vomeromodulin is a non-human protein also known as BPI fold containing family B, member 9 (BPIFB9) in the rat encoded by the Bpifb9/RYF3 gene, and as BPI fold containing family B, member 9A (BPIFB9A) encoded by the Bpifb9a gene in the mouse. This protein has been characterized in mammals such as rodents, carnivores, even-toed ungulates, insectivores, bats, lagomorphs, and shrews but is apparently absent in primates and other vertebrates such as birds, reptiles, and amphibians. Its function is associated with detection of chemical odorant pheromone molecules.

In humans no protein is expressed and it is present only as a pseudogene BPIFB9P. The pseudogene was named based on its functional ortholog found in the other species.

== Superfamily ==
Vomeromodulin/BPIFB9/BPIFB9A is a member of the BPI fold protein superfamily defined by the presence of the bactericidal/permeability-increasing protein fold (BPI fold) which is formed by two similar domains in a "boomerang" shape. This superfamily is also known as the BPI/LBP/PLUNC family or the BPI/LPB/CETP family. The BPI fold creates apolar binding pockets that can interact with hydrophobic and amphipathic molecules, such as the acyl carbon chains of lipopolysaccharide found on Gram-negative bacteria, but members of this family may have many other functions.

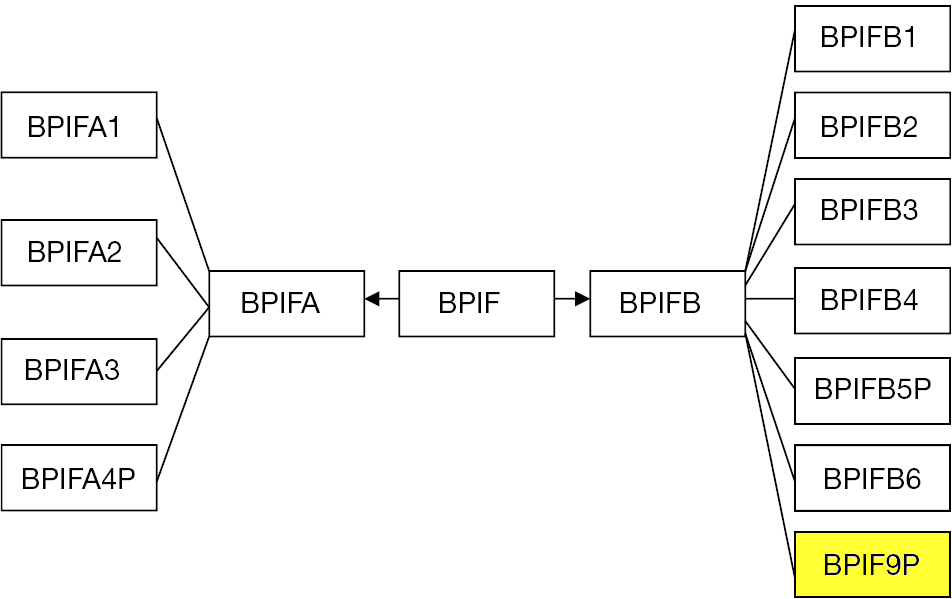
BPIFB9P is a human pseudogene member the BPI-fold gene family and the transcribed protein in other species is a member of the BPI/LBP/PLUNC protein superfamily

Genes for the BPI/LBP/PLUNC superfamily are found in all vertebrate species, including distant homologs in non-vertebrate species such as insects, mollusks, and roundworms. Within that broad grouping is the BPIF gene family whose members encode the BPI fold structural motif and are found clustered on a single chromosome, e.g., Chromosome 20 in humans, Chromosome 2 in mouse, Chromosome 3 in rat, Chromosome 17 in pig, Chromosome 13 in cow. The BPIF gene family is split into two groupings, BPIFA (SPLUNC) and BPIFB (LPLUNC). In humans, BIPFA consists of 3 protein encoding genes BPIFA1, BPIFA2, BPIFA3, and 1 pseudogene BPIFA4P; while BPIFB consists of 5 protein encoding genes BPIFB1, BPIFB2, BPIFB3, BPIFB4, BPIFB6 and 2 pseudogenes BPIFB5P, BPIFB9P. What appears as pseudogenes in humans may appear as fully functional genes in other species.

The PIFB9P pseudogene in humans was first reported in 2011 as a member of the BPI/LBP/PLUNC family, but clones containing PIFB9P had been detected in 1999 genomic screening by the Welcome Trust Sanger Institute.

== Function ==
In humans, the expression of the BPIFB9P pseudogene into functional BPIFB9 protein is unclear. Although identified multiple times by independent scientists as a pseudogene not capable of coding for a protein, its gene sequence may predict two transcripts (splice variants) and RNA transcripts detected by RNA-Seq screens have been observed in brain tissues, striated muscle, white blood cells (granulocytes, monocytes), and esophageal mucosa. Yet, definitive evidence for human BPIFB9 protein has never been produced and is unlikely to happen.

The non-human version of this protein, however, is well known. Vomeromodulin is highly expressed in nasal mucosa, particularly within a structure known as the Vomeronasal organ. The vomeronasal organ is present and well-developed in many mammals to process pheromone odors into neural signals to the brain, but the chemical and neural components of the vomeronasal system have been completely inactivated in most primates, including humans. In this context, BPIFB9-type proteins are thought to be similar to odorant binding proteins which presents odorant molecules to chemical odorant receptor molecules. Those odorant receptors, in turn, are associated with nasal epithelial cells integrated with olfactory neurons that project back to the brain's oflactory areas and hypothalamus. It has been established that the genes and proteins for these components are present and active in many mammal species, but in higher primates the genes are found to be mutated and appear as non-functional pseudogenes, like BPIFB9P.
