= BPIFB5P =

Pseudogene in the species Homo sapiens

Identifiers
- Aliases: BPIFB5P, BPI fold containing family B member 5, pseudogene
- External IDs: GeneCards: BPIFB5P

Gene location (Human)
Chr.	Chromosome 20 (human)
Band	20q11.21	Start	33,316,869 bp
Band	20q11.21	End	33,329,969 bp
Orthologs
Databases	NCBI: entry; OMA: entry
Species	Human	Mouse
Entrez	100505383	n/a
Ensembl	ENSG00000233146	n/a
UniProt	n a	n/a
RefSeq (mRNA)	n/a	n/a
RefSeq (protein)	n/a	n/a
Location (UCSC)	Chr 20: 33.32 – 33.33 Mb	n/a
PubMed search		n/a
- Wikidata
View/Edit Human

BPI fold containing family B, member 5 is a non-human protein encoded by the Bpifb5 gene, also known as Lplunc5. The BPIFB5 protein and Bpifb5 gene have been characterized in mammals such as rodents (mouse, rat) and even-toed ungulates (pig, cow) but are apparently lacking in primates and other vertebrates such as birds, reptiles, and amphibians. The protein in rodents is expressed at moderately high levels in mucosa of the airways (respiratory and olfactory epithelium) and at moderate levels in salivary glands, esophagus, and gonads (ovary, testis); in even-toed ungulates expression is high in testis, moderate in brain and striated muscle, and low in kidney.

In humans no protein is expressed and it is present only as a pseudogene BPIFB5P. The pseudogene was named based on its functional ortholog found in the other species.

== Superfamily ==
BPIFB5 is a member of the BPI fold protein superfamily defined by the presence of the bactericidal/permeability-increasing protein fold (BPI fold) which is formed by two similar domains in a "boomerang" shape. This superfamily is also known as the BPI/LBP/PLUNC family or the BPI/LPB/CETP family. The BPI fold creates apolar binding pockets that can interact with hydrophobic and amphipathic molecules, such as the acyl carbon chains of lipopolysaccharide found on Gram-negative bacteria, but members of this family may have many other functions.

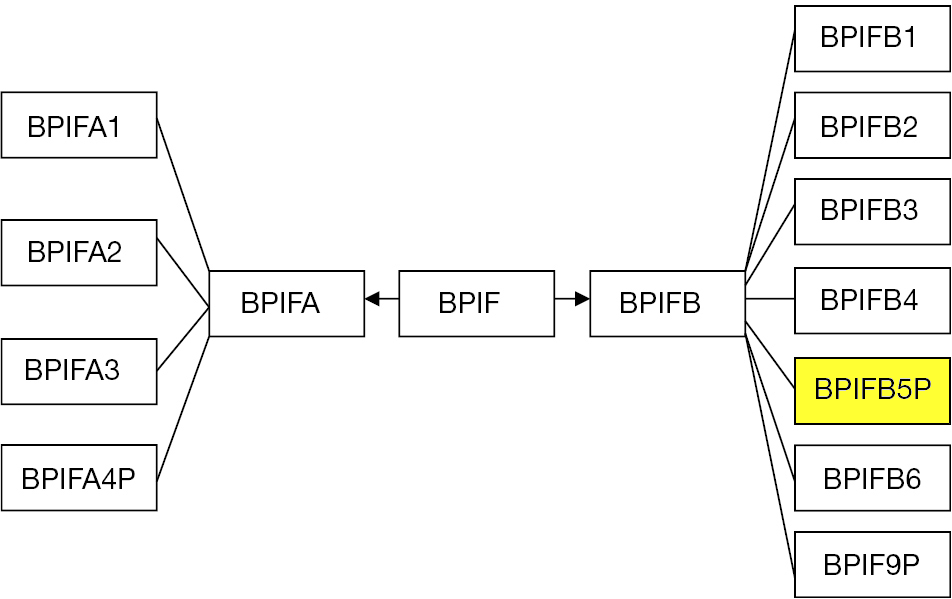
BPIFB5P is a human pseudogene member the BPI-fold gene family and the transcribed protein in other species is a member of the BPI/LBP/PLUNC protein superfamily

Genes for the BPI/LBP/PLUNC superfamily are found in all vertebrate species, including distant homologs in non-vertebrate species such as insects, mollusks, and roundworms. Within that broad grouping is the BPIF gene family whose members encode the BPI fold structural motif and are found clustered on a single chromosome, e.g., Chromosome 20 in humans, Chromosome 2 in mouse, Chromosome 3 in rat, Chromosome 17 in pig, Chromosome 13 in cow. The BPIF gene family is split into two groupings, BPIFA and BPIFB. In humans, BIPFA consists of 3 protein encoding genes BPIFA1, BPIFA2, BPIFA3, and 1 pseudogene BPIFA4P; while BPIFB consists of 5 protein encoding genes BPIFB1, BPIFB2, BPIFB3, BPIFB4, BPIFB6 and 2 pseudogenes BPIFB5P, BPIFB9P. What appears as pseudogenes in humans may appear as fully functional genes in other species.

The human BPIFB5P pseudogene is found clustered with other members of the BPIF gene family conforming to the pattern observed in mammals, but this is not the case for other vertebrate species. In a systematic analysis of the chicken genome, the Lplunc1(Bpifb1) / Lplunc5(Bpifb5) branch of the gene family was determined to be absent, therefore BPIFB1 and BPIFB5 proteins likely arose only after the speciation of mammals.
