= BPIFA4P =

Pseudogene in the species Homo sapiens

Identifiers
- Aliases: BPIFA4P, BASE, BPI fold containing family A member 4, pseudogene
- External IDs: OMIM: 607627; GeneCards: BPIFA4P

Gene location (Human)
Chr.	Chromosome 20 (human)
Band	20q11.21	Start	33,193,585 bp
Band	20q11.21	End	33,210,462 bp
Orthologs
Databases	NCBI: entry; OMA: entry
Species	Human	Mouse
Entrez	317716	n/a
Ensembl	ENSG00000183566	n/a
UniProt	n a	n/a
RefSeq (mRNA)	NM_173859	n/a
RefSeq (protein)	n/a	n/a
Location (UCSC)	Chr 20: 33.19 – 33.21 Mb	n/a
PubMed search		n/a
- Wikidata
View/Edit Human

BPI fold containing family A, member 4 (BPIFA4) is a non-human protein encoded by the Bpifa4 gene in mammals such as monkeys, cats, and cows but does not appear in rodents and humans. It is also known as Latherin in horses, encoded by the Lath/Bpifa4 gene but is somewhat divergent from the other species. Latherin/BPIFA4 is a secreted protein found in saliva and sweat.

In humans, no functional protein is expressed, therefore BPIFB4P is referred to as a pseudogene. However, a non-functional protein does appear; it known as BASE protein, secreted by breast cancer cell lines and salivary gland tissue (see section below).

== Superfamily ==
BPIFA3 is a member of a BPI fold protein superfamily defined by the presence of the bactericidal/permeability-increasing protein fold (BPI fold) which is formed by two similar domains in a "boomerang" shape. This superfamily is also known as the BPI/LBP/PLUNC family or the BPI/LPB/CETP family. The BPI fold creates apolar binding pockets that can interact with hydrophobic and amphipathic molecules, such as the acyl carbon chains of lipopolysaccharide found on Gram-negative bacteria, but members of this family may have many other functions.

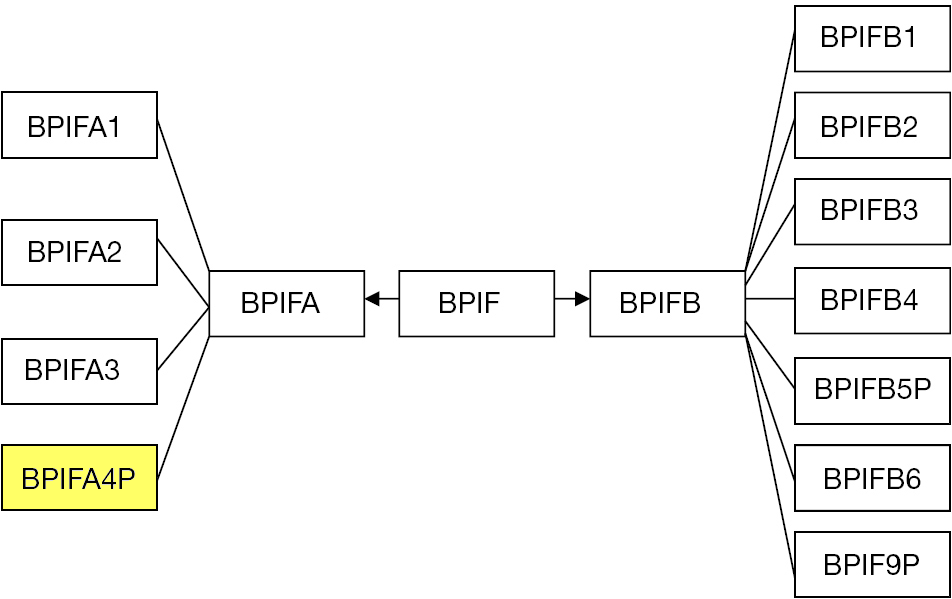
BPIFA4P is a human pseudogene member the BPI-fold gene family and the transcribed protein in other species is a member of the BPI/LBP/PLUNC protein superfamily

Genes for the BPI/LBP/PLUNC superfamily are found in all vertebrate species, including distant homologs in non-vertebrate species such as insects, mollusks, and roundworms. Within that broad grouping is the BPIF gene family whose members encode the BPI fold structural motif and are found clustered on a single chromosome, e.g., Chromosome 20 in humans, Chromosome 2 in mouse, Chromosome 3 in rat, Chromosome 17 in pig, Chromosome 13 in cow. The BPIF gene family is split into two groupings, BPIFA and BPIFB. In humans, BIPFA consists of 3 protein encoding genes BPIFA1, BPIFA2, BPIFA3, and 1 pseudogene BPIFA4P; while BPIFB consists of 5 protein encoding genes BPIFB1, BPIFB2, BPIFB3, BPIFB4, BPIFB6 and 2 pseudogenes BPIFB5P, BPIFB9P. What appears as pseudogenes in humans may appear as fully functional genes in other species.

== Function ==
Although BPIFA4P is identified as a pseudogene in humans, the RNA sequence for a putative protein has been detected at moderate levels in several glands (including salivary and mammillary), skin, and breast cancer. That pattern is consistent with the expression of normal BPIFA4/Latherin found in saliva and sweat of other species such as cow, horse, and sheep. The function of BPIFA4 in those species is associated with BPIFA gene family members' properties of being a surfactant and binding to bacterial lipopolysaccharides. Sweat helps animals cool down, and in animals with pelts/fur BPIFA4/Latherin significantly reduces surface tension of sweat, acting as a wetting agent to facilitate evaporative cooling. Further, it is speculated that the presence of a surfactant protein in the saliva of ruminant animals (e.g., cow, horse, sheep) may assist in mastication of large quantities of vegetable matter in their diet. BPIFA4 in saliva also may function as a first line of defense against bacteria, via bactericidal functions similar to other BIPFA and BIPFB family members.

=== BASE Protein ===
The expression of a pseudogene product in humans has caused unresolved issues about BPIFA4 in humans. This uncommon situation was summarized by Bingle and colleagues at University of Sheffield, who did extensive work on the BPI/LBP/PLUNC family:

"Human BPIFA4 appears to be an example of a pseudogene (and should be properly identified as BPIFA4P) that is perhaps better described as a 'dying' gene, since it appears to be both transcribed and translated, but no longer encodes a functional protein product."

That non-functional protein came to be known as BASE (Breast cancer And Salivary gland Expression) protein. Using a screening method for identifying human genes that code for membrane proteins, researchers at the National Cancer Institute discovered in 2003 a previously uncharacterized gene in breast cancer cell lines. With RT-PCR and Northern blot techniques, they detected the expression of BASE RNA in several breast cancer cell lines but not normal breast tissue. Separately BASE RNA expression was found in salivary gland tumors and normal salivary gland tissue. Thus the acronym was devised to reflect that pattern. Investigators at EMBL subsequently confirmed BASE/BPIFA4P expression in ~50% of actual breast cancer tumor samples they tested. In particular, BASE/BPIFA4P expression was present in tumors with high levels of ERα estrogen receptor but not in tumors with low ERα. However, it was shown experimentally that estrogen represses the expression of the BASE/BPIFA4P gene, while the transcription factor FOXA1 activates the expression of BASE/BPIFA4P. The undetermined interplay between ERα and FOXA1 is likely to be important in hormone receptor-positive disease and acquired anti-hormone resistance. Although the BASE protein's potential function was never investigated, the presence of the BASE/BPIFA4P gene was nevertheless considered a potentially useful marker for breast cancer screening.

The BASE gene deposited into US and European databases was eventually recognized as being a member of the BPI/LBP/PLUNC family and subsequently relabeled as BPIFA4P. It was further recognized that unlike other primate genes for BPIFA4, the human BASE/BPIFA4P gene was missing a single nucleotide in exon 6. That deletion causes a frameshift mutation which results in a "premature" stop codon. The resulting human BASE protein is much shorter than the functional BPIFA4 and Latherin proteins of other species. The original analysis predicted the BASE protein to be 19.5 kDa in size, but Western blots show the protein migrates at a size larger than 22 kDa. This truncated human BASE protein lacks key structural elements of a functional BPIFA4 protein, namely a long α-helical segment that creates the BPI fold. Without that, BASE cannot function like any other BPI/LBP/PLUNC family member and is thus considered functionless.
