= BPIFB3 =

Protein-coding gene in the species Homo sapiens

Identifiers
- Aliases: BPIFB3, C20orf185, LPLUNC3, RYA3, dJ726C3.4, BPI fold containing family B member 3
- External IDs: OMIM: 615717; MGI: 2675077; GeneCards: BPIFB3

Gene location (Human)
Chr.	Chromosome 20 (human)
Band	20q11.21	Start	33,053,903 bp
Band	20q11.21	End	33,073,847 bp

Gene location (Mouse)
Chr.	Chromosome 2 (mouse)
Band	2|2 H1	Start	153,760,150 bp
Band	2|2 H1	End	153,774,916 bp
RNA expression pattern
Bgee	Human / Mouse (ortholog); Top expressed in: olfactory zone of nasal mucosa; testicle; gonad; anterior pituitary; monocyte; right testis; left testis; exocrine gland; human digestive system; gut / Top expressed in: olfactory epithelium; vestibular sensory epithelium; otolith organ; utricle; stria vascularis; extraocular muscle; seminiferous tubule; cochlea; digastric muscle; submandibular gland; More reference expression data
BioGPS	n/a
Gene ontology
Molecular function	lipid binding
Cellular component	cytoplasm; extracellular region
Biological process	innate immune response
Sources:Amigo / QuickGO
Orthologs
Databases	NCBI: entry; OMA: entry
Species	Human	Mouse
Entrez	359710	378700
Ensembl	ENSG00000186190	ENSMUSG00000068008
UniProt	P59826	Q80ZU7
RefSeq (mRNA)	NM_182658; NM_001376932	NM_194357; NM_001379473
RefSeq (protein)	NP_872599; NP_001363861	NP_919338; NP_001366402
Location (UCSC)	Chr 20: 33.05 – 33.07 Mb	Chr 2: 153.76 – 153.77 Mb
PubMed search
- Wikidata
View/Edit Human	View/Edit Mouse

BPI fold containing family B, member 3 (BPIFB3) is a protein that in humans is encoded by the BPIFB3 gene. Two variants have been detected in humans.

== Superfamily ==
BPIFB3 is a member of a BPI fold protein superfamily defined by the presence of the bactericidal/permeability-increasing protein fold (BPI fold) which is formed by two similar domains in a "boomerang" shape. This superfamily is also known as the BPI/LBP/PLUNC family or the BPI/LPB/CETP family. The BPI fold creates apolar binding pockets that can interact with hydrophobic and amphipathic molecules, such as the acyl carbon chains of lipopolysaccharide found on Gram-negative bacteria, but members of this family may have many other functions.

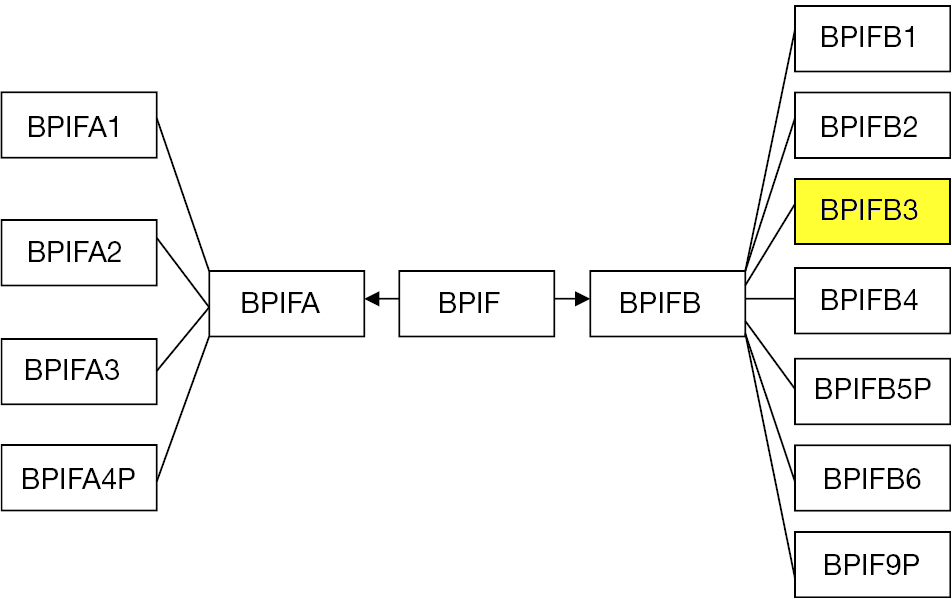
BPIFB3 is a member of the BPI-fold gene family and the BPI/LBP/PLUN protein superfamily

Genes for the BPI/LBP/PLUNC superfamily are found in all vertebrate species, including distant homologs in non-vertebrate species such as insects, mollusks, and roundworms. Within that broad grouping is the BPIF gene family whose members encode the BPI fold structural motif and are found clustered on a single chromosome, e.g., Chromosome 20 in humans, Chromosome 2 in mouse, Chromosome 3 in rat, Chromosome 17 in pig, Chromosome 13 in cow. The BPIF gene family is split into two groupings, BPIFA and BPIFB. In humans, BIPFA consists of 3 protein encoding genes BPIFA1, BPIFA2, BPIFA3, and 1 pseudogene BPIFA4P; while BPIFB consists of 5 protein encoding genes BPIFB1, BPIFB2, BPIFB3, BPIFB4, BPIFB6 and 2 pseudogenes BPIFB5P, BPIFB9P. What appears as pseudogenes in humans may appear as fully functional genes in other species.

BPIFB3 was first directly identified in a screen of rat olfactory epithelium as RYA3 and was recognized to be a member of the BPI fold superfamily. In humans, it was formerly known as "Long palate, lung and nasal epithelium carcinoma-associated protein 3" encoded by the LPLUNC3 gene. The BPIFB3 gene is found with other members of the BPIF gene family in a cluster on chromosome 20.

== Function ==
BPIFB3/RYA3 is highly expressed in olfactory epithelium and the tongue, within the cytoplasm of cells, and is thought to be similar to an odorant binding protein which presents odorant molecules to chemical odorant receptor molecules.

Like other BPI-fold family members involved in defense from infection, BPIFB3 may be involved in responses to viral infections such as the enteroviruses coxsackievirus B and poliovirus in epithelial and endothelial tissue. Its cytoplasmic location appears to be localized to the endoplasmic reticulum (ER) and influences the replication of coxsackievirus B; when BPIFB3 is knocked out in experimental systems coxsackievirus B replication dramatically increases. It has been within observed in the ER to be physically associated with another family member, BPIFB6, and modulation of either of these two proteins can enhance or suppress enteroviral release from cells.
