= BPIFB6 =

Protein-coding gene in the species Homo sapiens

Identifiers
- Aliases: BPIFB6, BPIL3, LPLUNC6, BPI fold containing family B member 6
- External IDs: OMIM: 614110; MGI: 2684965; GeneCards: BPIFB6

Gene location (Human)
Chr.	Chromosome 20 (human)
Band	20q11.21	Start	33,031,648 bp
Band	20q11.21	End	33,044,047 bp

Gene location (Mouse)
Chr.	Chromosome 2 (mouse)
Band	2|2 H1	Start	153,742,308 bp
Band	2|2 H1	End	153,754,715 bp
RNA expression pattern
Bgee	Human / Mouse (ortholog); Top expressed in: olfactory zone of nasal mucosa; superior surface of tongue; minor salivary glands; mucosa of esophagus / Top expressed in: ovary; white adipose tissue; adrenal gland; olfactory bulb; placenta; Cortex of frontal lobe; zone of skin; More reference expression data
BioGPS	n/a
Orthologs
Databases	NCBI: entry; OMA: entry
Species	Human	Mouse
Entrez	128859	228796
Ensembl	ENSG00000167104	ENSMUSG00000068009
UniProt	Q8NFQ5	Q8BU51
RefSeq (mRNA)	NM_174897	NM_199303
RefSeq (protein)	NP_777557	NP_955007
Location (UCSC)	Chr 20: 33.03 – 33.04 Mb	Chr 2: 153.74 – 153.75 Mb
PubMed search
- Wikidata
View/Edit Human	View/Edit Mouse

BPI fold containing family B, member 6 (BPIFB6), also known as bactericidal/permeability-increasing protein-like 3 (BPIL3), is a protein that in humans is encoded by the BPIFB6 gene, also known as BPIL3 and LPLUNC6. It is expressed at high levels in hypertrophic tonsils, at relatively moderate levels in oronasal epithelium including nasal mucosa, tongue, and salivary gland, as well as esophageal mucosa at lesser levels. Orthologs are present in many vertebrate species including mammals, birds, reptiles, and amphibians.

== Superfamily ==
BPIFB6 is a member of a BPI fold protein superfamily defined by the presence of the bactericidal/permeability-increasing protein fold (BPI fold) which is formed by two similar domains in a "boomerang" shape. This superfamily is also known as the BPI/LBP/PLUNC family or the BPI/LPB/CETP family. The BPI fold creates apolar binding pockets that can interact with hydrophobic and amphipathic molecules, such as the acyl carbon chains of lipopolysaccharide found on Gram-negative bacteria, but members of this family may have many other functions.

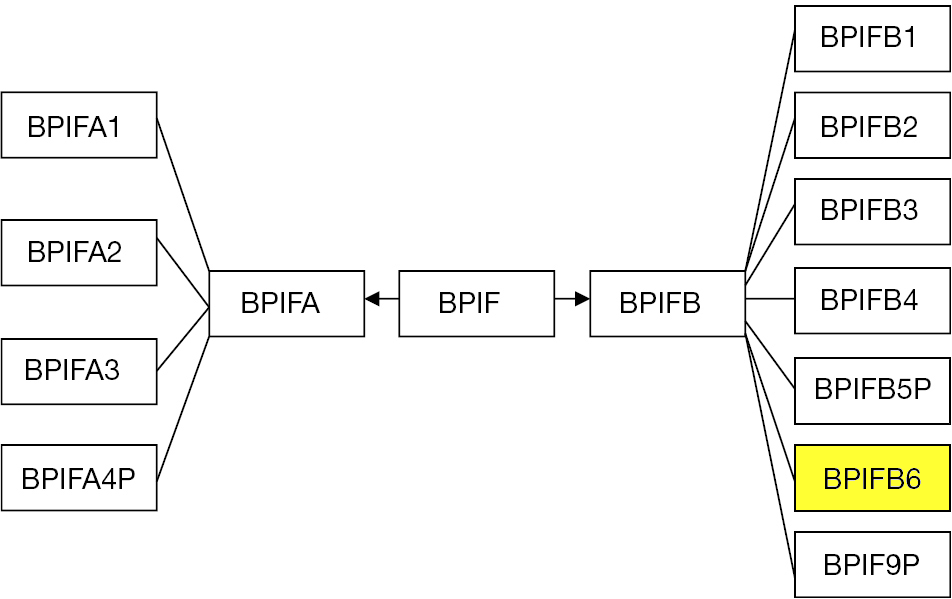
BPIFB6 is a member of the BPI-fold gene family and the BPI/LBP/PLUNC protein superfamily

Genes for the BPI/LBP/PLUNC superfamily are found in all vertebrate species, including distant homologs in non-vertebrate species such as insects, mollusks, and roundworms. Within that broad grouping is the BPIF gene family whose members encode the BPI fold structural motif and are found clustered on a single chromosome, e.g., Chromosome 20 in humans, Chromosome 2 in mouse, Chromosome 3 in rat, Chromosome 17 in pig, Chromosome 13 in cow. The BPIF gene family is split into two groupings, BPIFA and BPIFB. In humans, BIPFA consists of 3 protein encoding genes BPIFA1, BPIFA2, BPIFA3, and 1 pseudogene BPIFA4P; while BPIFB consists of 5 protein encoding genes BPIFB1, BPIFB2, BPIFB3, BPIFB4, BPIFB6 and 2 pseudogenes BPIFB5P, BPIFB9P. What appears as pseudogenes in humans may appear as fully functional genes in other species.

The BPIFB6 gene was first identified in humans as BPIL3 based on sequence homology and was immediately recognized to be a member of the BPI fold gene superfamily.

== Function ==
BPIFB6 may function as a regulator of secretory pathway trafficking within cells, which in turn may help regulate virus infections. BPIFB6 has been assumed to be a secreted protein, based on the similarity of its gene sequence to other family members that are secreted. But it has been demonstrated in one study to be located in the endoplasmic reticulum (ER). The ER exists as a network of sheets and tubules and BPIFB6 was found to localize primarily to ER sheets where it interacts with two other PBI fold family members, BPIFB2 and BPIFB3. Further, silencing of the BPIFB6 gene caused dramatic changes in the morphology of the Golgi complex, Golgi fragmentation, and disruption of normal cytoplasmic vesicles. This all points to a role for BPIFB6 in secretory pathway trafficking, which was further illustrated by its effects on viral replication. Viruses such as coxsackievirus B (CVB) and poliovirus (PV) co-opt the host cell's secretory pathway, which controls the transport of proteins from the endoplasmic reticulum to the Golgi complex, to facilitate their replication. When the BPIFB6 gene was silenced, CVB and PV replication was blocked.

BPIFB6's association with mucosa containing tissues re-emerged in a study of biomarkers in rectal cancer. In an epigenome-wide analysis of DNA methylation, BPIB6/BPIL3 was one of two genes were significantly hypomethylated. Also, tonsils which are mucosal lymphatic tissues, can become enlarged (hypertrophic) following inflammation from infection and recurrent pharyngitis (sore throat). Hypertrophic tonsils have been shown to have highly elevated expression of BPIFB6/BPIL3.
