= BPIFA3 =

Protein-coding gene in the species Homo sapiens

Identifiers
- Aliases: BPIFA3, C20orf71, SPLUNC3, BPI fold containing family A member 3
- External IDs: MGI: 1920638; GeneCards: BPIFA3

Gene location (Human)
Chr.	Chromosome 20 (human)
Band	20q11.21	Start	33,217,310 bp
Band	20q11.21	End	33,227,806 bp

Gene location (Mouse)
Chr.	Chromosome 2 (mouse)
Band	2|2 H1	Start	153,972,256 bp
Band	2|2 H1	End	153,980,276 bp
RNA expression pattern
Bgee	Human / Mouse (ortholog); Top expressed in: sperm; testicle; left testis; right testis; gonad; mucosa of ileum; lower lobe of lung; tail of epididymis; blood; human musculoskeletal system / Top expressed in: seminiferous tubule; spermatid; spermatocyte; ovary; pancreas; islet of Langerhans; spleen; More reference expression data
BioGPS	n/a
Orthologs
Databases	NCBI: entry; OMA: entry
Species	Human	Mouse
Entrez	128861	73388
Ensembl	ENSG00000131059	ENSMUSG00000027482
UniProt	Q9BQP9	Q9D9J8
RefSeq (mRNA)	NM_001042439; NM_178466	NM_001291079; NM_028528
RefSeq (protein)	NP_001035904; NP_848561	NP_001278008; NP_082804
Location (UCSC)	Chr 20: 33.22 – 33.23 Mb	Chr 2: 153.97 – 153.98 Mb
PubMed search
- Wikidata
View/Edit Human	View/Edit Mouse

BPI fold containing family A, member 3 (BPIFA3) is a protein that in humans is encoded by the BPIFA3 gene. The gene is also known as SPLUNC3 and C20orf71 in humans and the orthologous gene in mice is 1700058C13Rik.

== Tissue distribution ==
There are multiple variants of the BPIFA3 projected to be a secreted protein. It is very highly expressed in testis with little or no expression in other tissues. The Human Protein Atlas project and Mouse ENCODE Consortium report RNA-Seq expression at RPKM levels (reads per kilobases of transcript per 1 million mapped reads ) of 29.1 for human testis and 69.4 for mouse, but 0 for all other tissues. Similarly, the Bgee consortium, using multiple techniques in addition to RNA-Seq, reports a relative Expression Score of 95.8 out of 100 for testis and 99.0 for sperm in humans; however low levels of BPIFA3 between 20 and 30 were seen for a variety of tissues such as muscle, glands, prostate, nervous system, and skin.

== Superfamily ==
BPIFA3 is a member of a BPI fold protein superfamily defined by the presence of the bactericidal/permeability-increasing protein fold (BPI fold) which is formed by two similar domains in a "boomerang" shape. This superfamily is also known as the BPI/LBP/PLUNC family or the BPI/LPB/CETP family. The BPI fold creates apolar binding pockets that can interact with hydrophobic and amphipathic molecules, such as the acyl carbon chains of lipopolysaccharide found on Gram-negative bacteria, but members of this family may have many other functions.

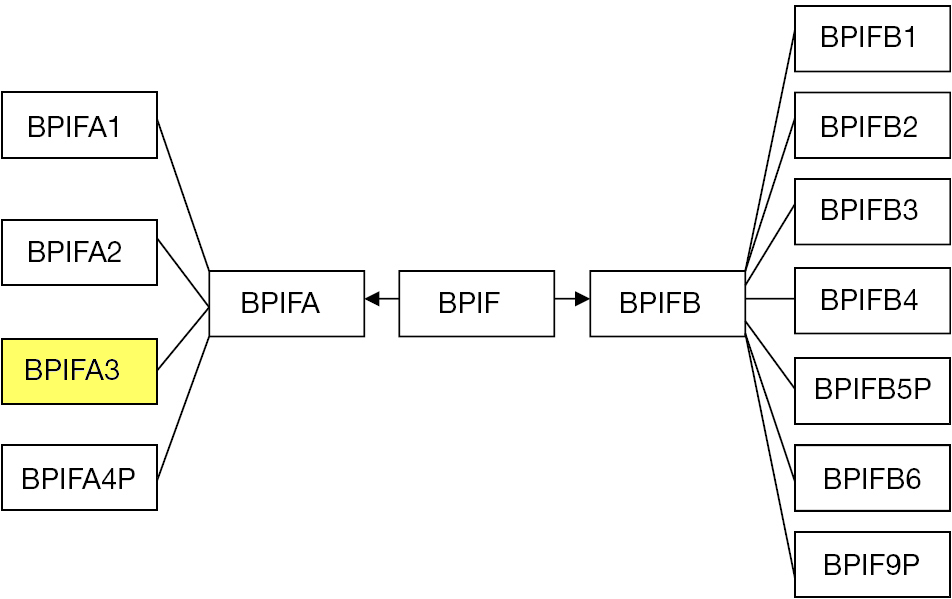
BPIFA3 is a member of the BPI-fold gene family and the BPI/LBP/PLUNC protein superfamily

Genes for the BPI/LBP/PLUNC superfamily are found in all vertebrate species, including distant homologs in non-vertebrate species such as insects, mollusks, and roundworms. Within that broad grouping is the BPIF gene family whose members encode the BPI fold structural motif and are found clustered on a single chromosome, e.g., Chromosome 20 in humans, Chromosome 2 in mouse, Chromosome 3 in rat, Chromosome 17 in pig, Chromosome 13 in cow. The BPIF gene family is split into two groupings, BPIFA and BPIFB. In humans, BIPFA consists of 3 protein encoding genes BPIFA1, BPIFA2, BPIFA3, and 1 pseudogene BPIFA4P; while BPIFB consists of 5 protein encoding genes BPIFB1, BPIFB2, BPIFB3, BPIFB4, BPIFB6 and 2 pseudogenes BPIFB5P, BPIFB9P. What appears as pseudogenes in humans may appear as fully functional genes in other species.

In humans, the BPIFA3 gene was first identified as a human PLUNC-related gene and later in mouse as 1700058C13Rik. Both were recognized as BPIF gene family members and were renamed BPIFA3 and Bpifa3, respectively.

== Function ==
Little is known about BPIFA3's function. Due to its high degree of similarity to other members of the BPI/LBP/PLUNC superfamily, it is predicted to have binding activity to lipids such as phospholipids and lipopolysaccharides but this has never been confirmed.

A putative function of BPIFA3 in bacterial host defense has been suggested. Despite a near-exclusive expression of BPIFA3 in testis, only a single report implicates it in any normal or pathological states and that involves Otitis media (OM) in the ear. OM is a common disease of early childhood characterized by inflammation of the middle ear cavity and an effort was made to identify genetic risk factors. A genome-wide association study was done in the "Raine Study," a longitudinal birth cohort of 2,868 children in which 1532 blood samples drawn at 1,2, and 3 years of age were analyzed for gene expression correlated to a susceptibility to OM. Unexpectedly, BPIFA3 and BPIFA1 were the top hits, along with CAPN14 and GALNT14 genes, none of which has previously been implicated in OM. The investigators noted that BPIF gene family members encode proteins involved in the early recognition of bacterial pathogens as part of the host defense at the nasopharyngeal, oral and lung entrances, and that expression of BPIFA3 and BPIFA1 may be a logical consequence of chronic bacterial presence in the pus filled, OM infected ear.
