= BPIFA2 =

Protein-coding gene in the species Homo sapiens

Identifiers
- Aliases: BPIFA2, C20orf70, PSP, SPLUNC2, bA49G10.1, BPI fold containing family A member 2
- External IDs: MGI: 97787; GeneCards: BPIFA2

Gene location (Human)
Chr.	Chromosome 20 (human)
Band	20q11.21	Start	33,161,768 bp
Band	20q11.21	End	33,181,412 bp

Gene location (Mouse)
Chr.	Chromosome 2 (mouse)
Band	2 H1|2 76.15 cM	Start	153,850,185 bp
Band	2 H1|2 76.15 cM	End	153,857,999 bp
RNA expression pattern
Bgee	Human / Mouse (ortholog); Top expressed in: parotid gland; nasal epithelium; tongue; body of tongue; mucosa of ileum; tibialis anterior muscle; sperm; superior surface of tongue; gonad; olfactory zone of nasal mucosa / Top expressed in: parotid gland; lacrimal gland; submandibular gland; extraocular muscle; masseter muscle; sexually immature organism; lymph node; olfactory epithelium; lumbar subsegment of spinal cord; meninges; More reference expression data
BioGPS	n/a
Gene ontology
Molecular function	protein binding; lipopolysaccharide binding; lipid binding
Cellular component	extracellular exosome; extracellular region
Biological process	defense response to bacterium; antimicrobial humoral response
Sources:Amigo / QuickGO
Orthologs
Databases	NCBI: entry; OMA: entry
Species	Human	Mouse
Entrez	140683	19194
Ensembl	ENSG00000131050	ENSMUSG00000042459
UniProt	Q96DR5	P07743
RefSeq (mRNA)	NM_080574; NM_001319164	NM_008953
RefSeq (protein)	NP_001306093; NP_542141	NP_032979
Location (UCSC)	Chr 20: 33.16 – 33.18 Mb	Chr 2: 153.85 – 153.86 Mb
PubMed search
- Wikidata
View/Edit Human	View/Edit Mouse

BPI fold containing family A, member 2 (BPIFA2), also known as Parotid Secretory Protein (PSP), is a protein that in humans is encoded by the BPIFA2 gene. The BPIFA2 gene sequence predicts multiple transcripts (splice variants); 2 mRNA variants have been well characterized. The resulting BPIFA2 is a secreted protein, expressed at very high levels in the parotid (salivary) gland; at high levels in oropharyngeal mucosa, including tongue; and at moderate levels many other tissue types and glands including mammary gland, testis, lung, bladder, blood, prostate, adrenal gland, kidney, and pancreas.

== Superfamily ==
BPIFA2 is a member of a BPI fold protein superfamily defined by the presence of the bactericidal/permeability-increasing protein fold (BPI fold) which is formed by two similar domains in a "boomerang" shape. This superfamily is also known as the BPI/LBP/PLUNC family or the BPI/LPB/CETP family. The BPI fold creates apolar binding pockets that can interact with hydrophobic and amphipathic molecules, such as the acyl carbon chains of lipopolysaccharide found on Gram-negative bacteria, but members of this family may have many other functions.

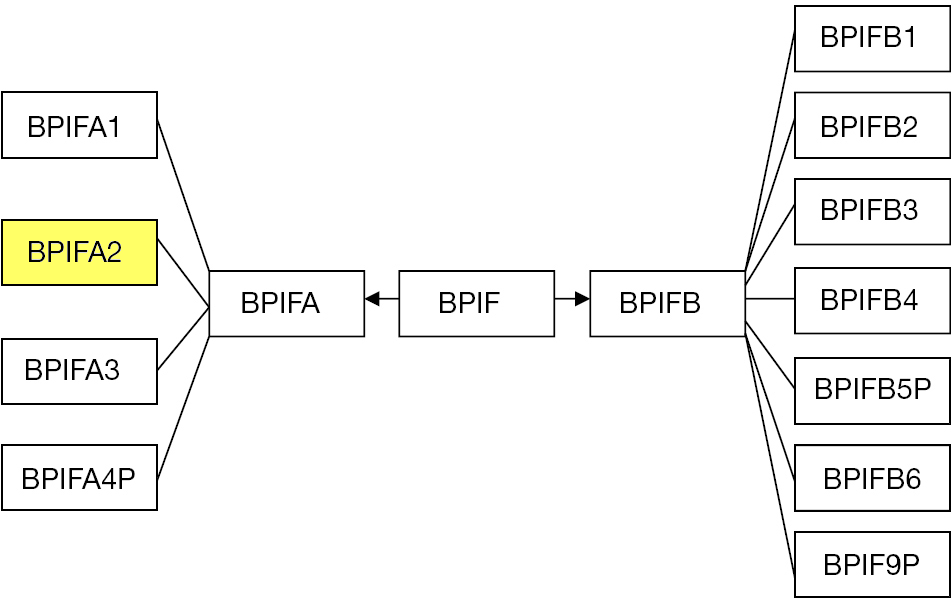
BPIFA2 is a member of the BPI-fold gene family and the BPI/LBP/PLUNC protein superfamily

Genes for the BPI/LBP/PLUNC superfamily are found in all vertebrate species, including distant homologs in non-vertebrate species such as insects, mollusks, and roundworms. Within that broad grouping is the BPIF gene family whose members encode the BPI fold structural motif and are found clustered on a single chromosome, e.g., Chromosome 20 in humans, Chromosome 2 in mouse, Chromosome 3 in rat, Chromosome 17 in pig, Chromosome 13 in cow. The BPIF gene family is split into two groupings, BPIFA and BPIFB. In humans, BIPFA consists of 3 protein encoding genes BPIFA1, BPIFA2, BPIFA3, and 1 pseudogene BPIFA4P; while BPIFB consists of 5 protein encoding genes BPIFB1, BPIFB2, BPIFB3, BPIFB4, BPIFB6 and 2 pseudogenes BPIFB5P, BPIFB9P. What appears as pseudogenes in humans may appear as fully functional genes in other species.

In humans, the BPIFA2 gene was first identified as a human PLUNC-related gene. It had been identified shortly before as human PSP and nearly a decade and half earlier as the mouse PSP gene.

== Function ==
The function of PSP had remained unknown for many years until it was finally recognized to be within the BPI/LBP/PLUNC family, and then the bactericidal properties of that family was recognized for BPIFA2/PSP/SPLUNC2. It is primarily secreted into saliva and is therefore among the first line of defense against pathogens entering the mouth. BPIFA1 can bind to lipopolysaccharide (LPS) on bacteria and induce clumping agglutination of bacteria, a major antibacterial function for salivary proteins. For example, BPIFA2 protein was shown to inhibit the growth of Pseudomonas aeruginosa, although it did not cause agglutination of these bacteria.

Like BPIFA1/PLUNC which acts as a surfactant to lower the surface tension in mucosal fluids, BPIFA2/PIP also is a crucial surfactant in saliva. When the gene is silenced in a knockout mouse, the saliva exhibits the surface tension of water. Further, without BPIFA2/PIP, levels of LPS in saliva were lower than in normal mice and the knockout mice exhibited signs of endotoxemia, suggesting bacteria were bypassing the first line of defense and passing into the digestive tract to cause mild inflammation.
