= BPIFB4 =

Protein-coding gene in the species Homo sapiens

Identifiers
- Aliases: BPIFB4, C20orf186, LPLUNC4, RY2G5, dJ726C3.5, BPI fold containing family B member 4
- External IDs: OMIM: 615718; MGI: 2685852; GeneCards: BPIFB4

Gene location (Human)
Chr.	Chromosome 20 (human)
Band	20q11.21	Start	33,079,643 bp
Band	20q11.21	End	33,111,751 bp

Gene location (Mouse)
Chr.	Chromosome 2 (mouse)
Band	2|2 H1	Start	153,780,141 bp
Band	2|2 H1	End	153,806,021 bp
RNA expression pattern
Bgee	Human / Mouse (ortholog); Top expressed in: testicle; olfactory zone of nasal mucosa; anterior pituitary; gonad; left testis; right testis; tonsil; right auricle of heart; sural nerve; white blood cell / Top expressed in: ovary; embryo; embryo; epiblast; blastocyst; placenta; Cortex of frontal lobe; olfactory bulb; More reference expression data
BioGPS	n/a
Orthologs
Databases	NCBI: entry; OMA: entry
Species	Human	Mouse
Entrez	149954	381399
Ensembl	ENSG00000186191	ENSMUSG00000074665
UniProt	P59827	A2BGH0
RefSeq (mRNA)	NM_182519	NM_001034875
RefSeq (protein)	NP_872325	NP_001030047
Location (UCSC)	Chr 20: 33.08 – 33.11 Mb	Chr 2: 153.78 – 153.81 Mb
PubMed search
- Wikidata
View/Edit Human	View/Edit Mouse

BPI fold containing family B, member 4 (BPIFB4) is a protein that in humans is encoded by the BPIFB4 gene. It was formerly known as "Long palate, lung and nasal epithelium carcinoma-associated protein 4" encoded by the LPLUNC4 gene. The BPIFB4 gene sequence predicts 4 transcripts (splice variants); 3 isoforms have been well characterized. In a variety of mammals, BPIFB4 is generally expressed in very high levels in the olfactory epithelium (nasal mucosa), high levels in the gonads (testis, ovary) and pituitary, moderate levels in white blood cells (monocytes) It can occur either localized in the cytoplasm of cells or secreted and circulated systemically in blood plasma.

== Superfamily ==
BPIFB4 is a member of a BPI fold protein superfamily defined by the presence of the bactericidal/permeability-increasing protein fold (BPI fold) which is formed by two similar domains in a "boomerang" shape. This superfamily is also known as the BPI/LBP/PLUNC family or the BPI/LPB/CETP family. The BPI fold creates apolar binding pockets that can interact with hydrophobic and amphipathic molecules, such as the acyl carbon chains of lipopolysaccharide found on Gram-negative bacteria, but members of this family may have many other functions.

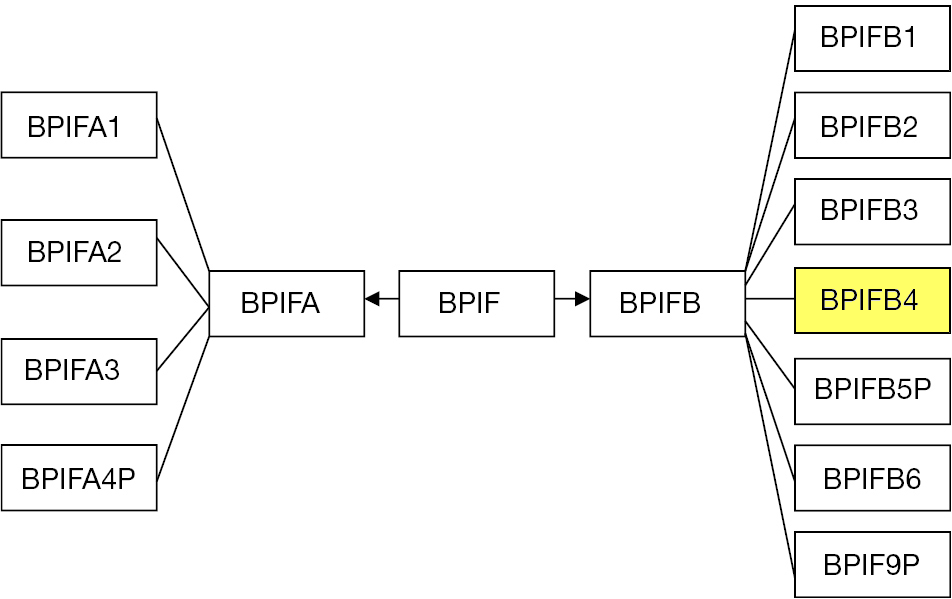
BPIFB4 is a member of the BPI-fold gene family and the BPI/LBP/PLUNC protein superfamily

Genes for the BPI/LBP/PLUNC superfamily are found in all vertebrate species, including distant homologs in non-vertebrate species such as insects, mollusks, and roundworms. Within that broad grouping is the BPIF gene family whose members encode the BPI fold structural motif and are found clustered on a single chromosome, e.g., Chromosome 20 in humans, Chromosome 2 in mouse, Chromosome 3 in rat, Chromosome 17 in pig, Chromosome 13 in cow. The BPIF gene family is split into two groupings, BPIFA and BPIFB. In humans, BIPFA consists of 3 protein encoding genes BPIFA1, BPIFA2, BPIFA3, and 1 pseudogene BPIFA4P; while BPIFB consists of 5 protein encoding genes BPIFB1, BPIFB2, BPIFB3, BPIFB4, BPIFB6 and 2 pseudogenes BPIFB5P, BPIFB9P. What appears as pseudogenes in humans may appear as fully functional genes in other species.

BPIFB4 occurs as 3 separate isoforms in humans. These isoforms were discovered in a genome-wide association study of centenarians that revealed 3 haplotypes of the BPIFB4 gene: wild-type (WT-BPIFB4), a longevity-associated variant (LAV-BPIFB4) with a 29% allele frequency, and a rare variant (RV-BPIFB4) with a 5% allele frequency. The BPIFB4 gene is found with other members of the BPIF gene family in a cluster on chromosome 20 in humans.

== Function ==
BPIFB4 protein is normally expressed in olfactory epithelium, mononuclear cells and macrophage-like cells as well as a variety of progenitor/stem cell types. In the olfactory mucosa it is believed to act similarly to other BPIFB proteins in the innate immune response to bacterial exposure. BPIFB4 found circulating in the bloodstream is believed to interact with endothelial cells lining blood vessels which subsequently results in a vasorelaxation of the smooth muscle cells of blood vessels.

=== Longevity-associated variant LAV-BPIFB4 ===
In individuals with high circulating levels of LAV-BPIFB4, it appears to be cardioprotective and immunodulatory (anti-inflammatory). In a study of long-living individuals (LLI), the circulating plasma levels of PBIB4 protein was compared between middle aged individuals (45–59 years old), healthy LLI (95–97 years old), and frail LLI (96-99 year old). Circulating BPIB4 was much higher in the healthy LLI group (824 pg/mL) compared to middle aged controls (133 pg/mL) and the frail LLI group (21 pg/mL).

LAV-BPIFB4 is believed to be cardioprotective due to overall improved endothelial cell function, lowering blood pressure and improving revascularization when cardiac tissue may be compromised. This effect arises from a cascade of biochemical events. WT-BPIFB4 and LAV-BPIFB4 have different subcellular localization; WT-BPIFB4 localizes to the cell nucleus while LAV-BPIFB4 is cytoplasmic. LAV-BPIFB4 in the endoplasmic reticulum (ER) is phosphorylated by Protein Kinase R (PKR) which results in enhanced protein unfolding, reduced ER stress, and overall improved cellular homeostasis. In addition to phosphorylation by PKR, LAV-BPIFB4 can be phosphorylated by Protein Kinase C alpha. In either case, when LAV-BPIFB4 becomes phosphorylated in the cytosol, it can then interact with 14-3-3 protein and Heat Shock Protein 90, forming a complex. This complex, in turn, activates eNOS. Activated eNOS produces nitric oxide which causes vasorelaxation of smooth muscle cells in blood vessels throughout the circulatory system, lowering blood pressure. Furthermore, increased nitric oxide from activated eNOS promotes the sprouting of new capillaries (angiogenesis) in conditions when ischemia occurs caused by the blockage of arteries by atherosclerosis, for example.

LAV-BPIFB4 is believed to be immunomodulatory due to a variety of mechanisms involving macrophages and monocytes that can counteract low-grade chronic inflammatory conditions. BPIFB4 induces a M2 macrophage polarizing effect which helps resolve inflammation, help tissue healing, and tolerate self-antigens. BPIFB4 induces a redistribution of circulating monocytes from classical monocytes (CD14++CD16-) to non-classical monocytes (CD14++CD16++), normally elevated in patients with coronary artery disease but in this case thought to patrol the vasculature and remove damaged cells in several disease conditions, thereby aiding tissue healing. BPIFB4 also reduces T-cell activation demonstrated by suppression of T cell proliferation and elevation of circulating levels of interleukins IL-23, IL-27 and atheroprotective IL-33.
