= BPIFB2 =

Protein-coding gene in the species Homo sapiens

Identifiers
- Aliases: BPIFB2, BPIL1, C20orf184, LPLUNC2, RYSR, dJ726C3.2, BPI fold containing family B member 2
- External IDs: OMIM: 614108; MGI: 1913807; GeneCards: BPIFB2

Gene location (Human)
Chr.	Chromosome 20 (human)
Band	20q11.21	Start	33,007,704 bp
Band	20q11.21	End	33,023,703 bp

Gene location (Mouse)
Chr.	Chromosome 2 (mouse)
Band	2|2 H1	Start	153,716,965 bp
Band	2|2 H1	End	153,737,190 bp
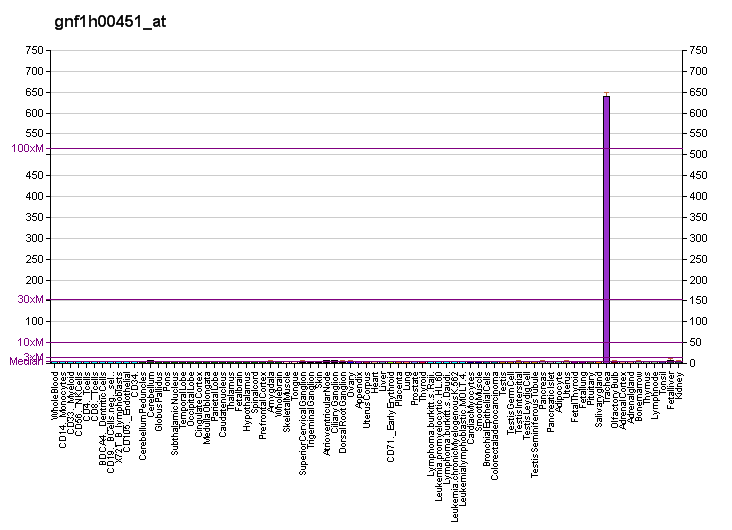
RNA expression pattern
Bgee	Human / Mouse (ortholog); Top expressed in: trachea; olfactory zone of nasal mucosa; minor salivary glands; mucosa of pharynx; urethra; oral cavity; tongue; parotid gland; superior surface of tongue; body of tongue / Top expressed in: trachea; seminiferous tubule; spermatid; nucleus of brain; telencephalic nucleus; basal forebrain; cerebral hemisphere; septal nuclei; nucleus of stria terminalis; More reference expression data
BioGPS	More reference expression data
Gene ontology
Molecular function	lipid binding
Cellular component	extracellular exosome; extracellular region; extracellular space; endoplasmic reticulum lumen
Biological process	antimicrobial humoral response; post-translational protein modification
Sources:Amigo / QuickGO
Orthologs
Databases	NCBI: entry; OMA: entry
Species	Human	Mouse
Entrez	80341	66557
Ensembl	ENSG00000078898	ENSMUSG00000027481
UniProt	Q8N4F0	Q8C1E1
RefSeq (mRNA)	NM_025227	NM_025631
RefSeq (protein)	NP_079503	NP_079907
Location (UCSC)	Chr 20: 33.01 – 33.02 Mb	Chr 2: 153.72 – 153.74 Mb
PubMed search
- Wikidata
View/Edit Human	View/Edit Mouse

BPI fold-containing family B, member 2, (BPIFB2) also known as bactericidal/permeability-increasing protein-like 1, (BPI-like 1) is a protein that in humans is encoded by the BPIFB2 gene.

== Superfamily ==
BPIFB2 is a member of a BPI fold protein superfamily defined by the presence of the bactericidal/permeability-increasing protein fold (BPI fold) which is formed by two similar domains in a "boomerang" shape. This superfamily is also known as the BPI/LBP/PLUNC family or the BPI/LPB/CETP family. The BPI fold creates apolar binding pockets that can interact with hydrophobic and amphipathic molecules, such as the acyl carbon chains of lipopolysaccharide found on Gram-negative bacteria, but members of this family may have many other functions.

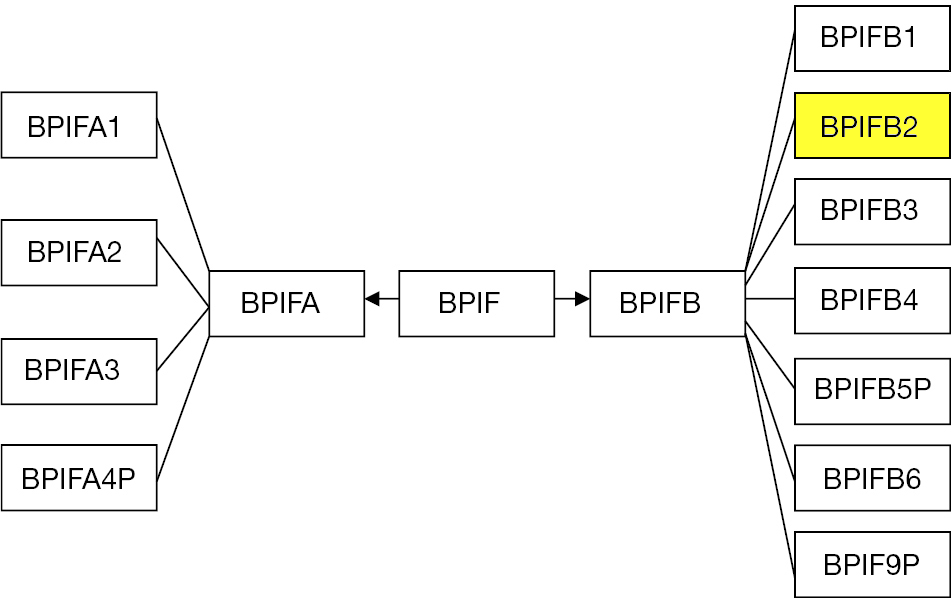
BPIFB2 is a member of the BPI-fold gene family and the BPI/LBP/PLUNC protein superfamily

Genes for the BPI/LBP/PLUNC superfamily are found in all vertebrate species, including distant homologs in non-vertebrate species such as insects, mollusks, and roundworms. Within that broad grouping is the BPIF gene family whose members encode the BPI fold structural motif and are found clustered on a single chromosome, e.g., Chromosome 20 in humans, Chromosome 2 in mouse, Chromosome 3 in rat, Chromosome 17 in pig, Chromosome 13 in cow. The BPIF gene family is split into two groupings, BPIFA and BPIFB. In humans, BIPFA consists of 3 protein encoding genes BPIFA1, BPIFA2, BPIFA3, and 1 pseudogene BPIFA4P; while BPIFB consists of 5 protein encoding genes BPIFB1, BPIFB2, BPIFB3, BPIFB4, BPIFB6 and 2 pseudogenes BPIFB5P, BPIFB9P. What appears as pseudogenes in humans may appear as fully functional genes in other species.

In humans, the BPIFB2 gene was first identified as a BPIL3 gene whose encoded protein was called LPLUNC2 (long-palate lung and nasal epithelium clone 2), but subsequently PLUNC proteins were classified as a subfamily of the BPI fold superfamily. In humans, the BPIFB2 gene is found with other members of the BPI/LBP/PLUNC superfamily in a cluster on Chromosome 20.

== Function ==
The BPIFB2 protein is involved in the innate immune response to bacterial exposure in the mucosa of the mouth, nasal cavities, and lungs, like other closely related BPIFB proteins. In particular, it is highly expressed in normal salivary glands and esophagus as well as in hypertrophic tonsils in humans. In chronic rhinosinusitis BPIFB2/LPLUNC2 levels are profoundly reduced which has been interpreted as a defect in the release of glandular innate defense molecules.
