= BPIFB1 =

Protein-coding gene in the species Homo sapiens

Identifiers
- Aliases: BPIFB1, C20orf114, LPLUNC1, BPI fold containing family B member 1
- External IDs: MGI: 2137431; GeneCards: BPIFB1

Gene location (Human)
Chr.	Chromosome 20 (human)
Band	20q11.21	Start	33,273,480 bp
Band	20q11.21	End	33,309,871 bp

Gene location (Mouse)
Chr.	Chromosome 2 (mouse)
Band	2|2 H1	Start	154,032,738 bp
Band	2|2 H1	End	154,062,289 bp
RNA expression pattern
Bgee	Human / Mouse (ortholog); Top expressed in: bronchus; bronchial epithelial cell; trachea; olfactory zone of nasal mucosa; nasal epithelium; mucosa of paranasal sinus; parotid gland; epithelium of nasopharynx; minor salivary glands; mucosa of pharynx / Top expressed in: epithelium of stomach; mucous cell of stomach; trachea; right lung; right lung lobe; olfactory epithelium; lumbar spinal ganglion; external carotid artery; sexually immature organism; internal carotid artery; More reference expression data
BioGPS	n/a
Gene ontology
Molecular function	lipid binding; molecular function
Cellular component	extracellular exosome; extracellular region; extracellular space
Biological process	innate immune response in mucosa; innate immune response; negative regulation of toll-like receptor 4 signaling pathway; immune system process; antimicrobial humoral response
Sources:Amigo / QuickGO
Orthologs
Databases	NCBI: entry; OMA: entry
Species	Human	Mouse
Entrez	92747	228801
Ensembl	ENSG00000125999	ENSMUSG00000027485
UniProt	Q8TDL5	Q61114
RefSeq (mRNA)	NM_033197	NM_001012392; NM_153418
RefSeq (protein)	NP_149974	NP_001012392; NP_700467
Location (UCSC)	Chr 20: 33.27 – 33.31 Mb	Chr 2: 154.03 – 154.06 Mb
PubMed search
- Wikidata
View/Edit Human	View/Edit Mouse

BPI fold-containing family B member 1 (BPIFB1) is a protein that in humans is encoded by the BPIFB1 gene. BPIFB1 is a secreted protein, expressed at very high levels in mucosa of the airways (respiratory and olfactory epithelium) and salivary glands, and at moderate levels in the digestive tract (tongue, stomach, intestinal epithelium) and pancreas.

== Superfamily ==
BPIFB1 is a member of a BPI fold protein superfamily defined by the presence of the bactericidal/permeability-increasing protein fold (BPI fold) which is formed by two similar domains in a "boomerang" shape. This superfamily is also known as the BPI/LBP/PLUNC family or the BPI/LPB/CETP family. The BPI fold creates apolar binding pockets that can interact with hydrophobic and amphipathic molecules, such as the acyl carbon chains of lipopolysaccharide found on Gram-negative bacteria, but members of this family may have many other functions.

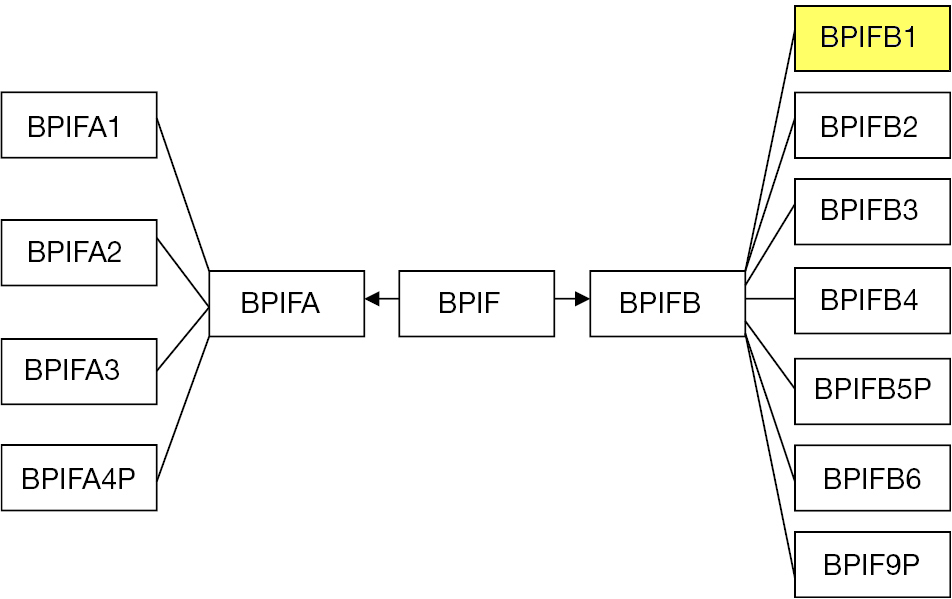
BPIFB1 is a member of the BPI-fold gene family and the BPI/LBP/PLUNC protein superfamily

Genes for the BPI/LBP/PLUNC superfamily are found in all vertebrate species, including distant homologs in non-vertebrate species such as insects, mollusks, and roundworms. Within that broad grouping is the BPIF gene family whose members encode the BPI fold structural motif and are found clustered on a single chromosome, e.g., Chromosome 20 in humans, Chromosome 2 in mouse, Chromosome 3 in rat, Chromosome 17 in pig, Chromosome 13 in cow. The BPIF gene family is split into two groupings, BPIFA and BPIFB. In humans, BIPFA consists of 3 protein encoding genes BPIFA1, BPIFA2, BPIFA3, and 1 pseudogene BPIFA4P; while BPIFB consists of 5 protein encoding genes BPIFB1, BPIFB2, BPIFB3, BPIFB4, BPIFB6 and 2 pseudogenes BPIFB5P, BPIFB9P. What appears as pseudogenes in humans may appear as fully functional genes in other species.

BPIFB1 was also identified as the LPLUNC1 gene (long-palate lung and nasal epithelium clone 1) in mouse, but subsequently PLUNC proteins were classified as a subfamily of the BPI fold superfamily. In a systematic analysis of the chicken genome, the Lplunc1(Bpifb1) / Lplunc5(Bpifb5) branch of the gene family was determined to be absent, therefore BPIFB1 and BPIFB5 proteins likely arose only after the speciation of mammals.

== Function ==
In mammals, the BPIFB1 protein is involved in the innate immune response to bacterial exposure in the mucosa of the mouth, nasal cavities, lungs, and digestive tract. It has a role in sensing and responding to Gram-negative bacteria and contributes to anti-bacterial activity.

In humans it is abnormally expressed in a respiratory diseases such as cystic fibrosis (CF), chronic obstructive pulmonary disease (COPD), and asthma. It is also differentially in tumors such as nasopharyngeal carcinoma (NPC), gastric cancer, salivary gland tumors, and lung cancer therefore BPIFB1 has been considered to be a therapeutic target for these conditions. For example, BPIFB1 expression is suppressed in NPC but when the gene is over-expressed in cell cultures and in mice, tumor cell migration and invasion (metastases) is reduced.
