= BPIFA1 =

Protein-coding gene in the species Homo sapiens

Identifiers
- Aliases: BPIFA1, LUNX, NASG, PLUNC, SPLUNC1, SPURT, bA49G10.5, BPI fold containing family A member 1
- External IDs: OMIM: 607412; MGI: 1338036; GeneCards: BPIFA1
Available structures
PDB	Ortholog search: PDBe RCSB
PDB	List of PDB id codes 4KEG, 4KGH, 4KGO, 4N4X, 5I7K, 5I7J, 5I7L

Gene location (Human)
Chr.	Chromosome 20 (human)
Band	20q11.21	Start	33,235,995 bp
Band	20q11.21	End	33,243,311 bp

Gene location (Mouse)
Chr.	Chromosome 2 (mouse)
Band	2|2 H1	Start	153,984,800 bp
Band	2|2 H1	End	153,991,139 bp
RNA expression pattern
Bgee	Human / Mouse (ortholog); Top expressed in: olfactory zone of nasal mucosa; nasal epithelium; mucosa of paranasal sinus; trachea; bronchus; epithelium of bronchus; bronchial epithelial cell; tongue; superior surface of tongue; body of tongue / Top expressed in: trachea; nasal epithelium; olfactory epithelium; right lung; right lung lobe; median eminence; vestibular membrane of cochlear duct; extraocular muscle; cochlea; sexually immature organism; More reference expression data
BioGPS	n/a
Gene ontology
Molecular function	lipid binding; protein binding; molecular function
Cellular component	extracellular region; extracellular space
Biological process	negative regulation of single-species biofilm formation in or on host organism; multicellular organismal water homeostasis; defense response to bacterium; regulation of sodium ion transmembrane transport; antibacterial humoral response; immune system process; innate immune response; antimicrobial humoral response; regulation of liquid surface tension; immune response in nasopharyngeal-associated lymphoid tissue; antimicrobial humoral immune response mediated by antimicrobial peptide
Sources:Amigo / QuickGO
Orthologs
Databases	NCBI: entry; OMA: entry
Species	Human	Mouse
Entrez	51297	18843
Ensembl	ENSG00000198183	ENSMUSG00000027483
UniProt	Q9NP55	P97361
RefSeq (mRNA)	NM_001243193; NM_016583; NM_130852	NM_011126
RefSeq (protein)	NP_001230122; NP_057667; NP_570913	NP_035256
Location (UCSC)	Chr 20: 33.24 – 33.24 Mb	Chr 2: 153.98 – 153.99 Mb
PubMed search
- Wikidata
View/Edit Human	View/Edit Mouse

BPI fold containing family A, member 1 (BPIFA1), also known as Palate, lung, and nasal epithelium clone (PLUNC), is a protein that in humans is encoded by the BPIFA1 gene. It was also formerly known as "Secretory protein in upper respiratory tracts" (SPURT). The BPIFA1 gene sequence predicts 4 transcripts (splice variants); 3 mRNA variants have been well characterized. The resulting BPIFA1 is a secreted protein, expressed at very high levels in mucosa of the airways (olfactory and respiratory and epithelium) and salivary glands; at high levels in oropharyneal epithelium, including tongue and tonsils; and at moderate levels many other tissue types and glands including pituitary, testis, lung, bladder, blood, prostate, pancreas, levels in the digestive tract (tongue, stomach, intestinal epithelium) and pancreas. The protein can be detected on the apical side of epithelial cells and in airway surface liquid, nasal mucus, and sputum.

== Superfamily ==
BPIFA1 is a member of a BPI fold protein superfamily defined by the presence of the bactericidal/permeability-increasing protein fold (BPI fold) which is formed by two similar domains in a "boomerang" shape. This superfamily is also known as the BPI/LBP/PLUNC family or the BPI/LPB/CETP family. The BPI fold creates apolar binding pockets that can interact with hydrophobic and amphipathic molecules, such as the acyl carbon chains of lipopolysaccharide found on Gram-negative bacteria, but members of this family may have many other functions.

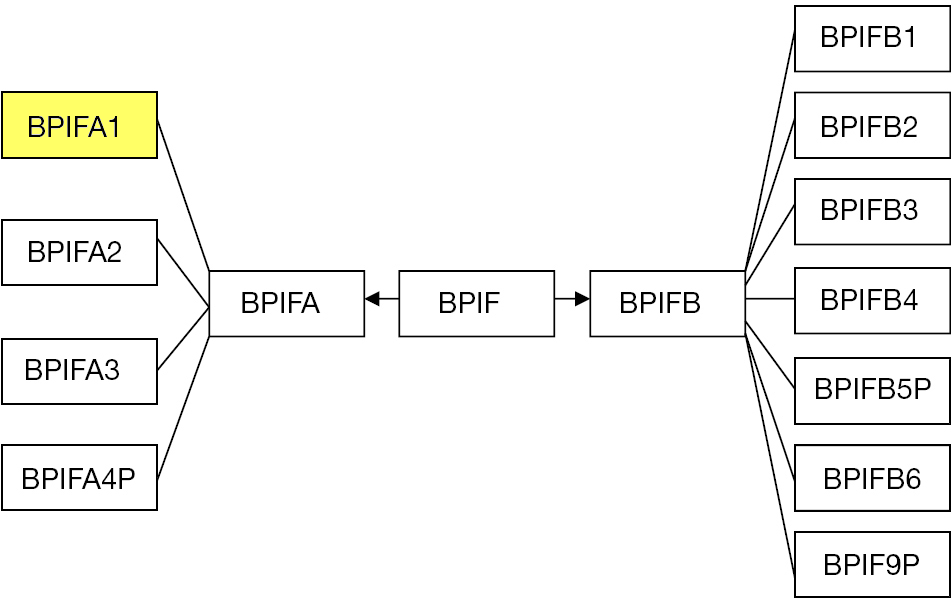
BPIFA1 is a member of the BPI-fold gene family and the BPI/LBP/PLUNC protein superfamily

Genes for the BPI/LBP/PLUNC superfamily are found in all vertebrate species, including distant homologs in non-vertebrate species such as insects, mollusks, and roundworms. Within that broad grouping is the BPIF gene family whose members encode the BPI fold structural motif and are found clustered on a single chromosome, e.g., Chromosome 20 in humans, Chromosome 2 in mouse, Chromosome 3 in rat, Chromosome 17 in pig, Chromosome 13 in cow. The BPIF gene family is split into two groupings, BPIFA and BPIFB. In humans, BIPFA consists of 3 protein encoding genes BPIFA1, BPIFA2, BPIFA3, and 1 pseudogene BPIFA4P; while BPIFB consists of 5 protein encoding genes BPIFB1, BPIFB2, BPIFB3, BPIFB4, BPIFB6 and 2 pseudogenes BPIFB5P, BPIFB9P. What appears as pseudogenes in humans may appear as fully functional genes in other species.

In humans, the BPIFA1 gene was first identified as an ortholog of the mouse Plunc gene which had earlier been identified from a differential display screen of the embryonic mouse palate. Subsequently, using microarray analysis techniques of human epithelial tissues, the SPURT gene and, separately, the SPLUNC1 gene were identified. These were all recognized to be, in fact, the same gene within the BPI/LBP/PLUNC family.

== Function ==
BPIFA1 has multiple functions but perhaps its most prominent ones are related to BPIFA1's localization in nasal, olfactory, oral, and respiratory epithelium and the mucous/fluids that coat them. BPIFA1/SPLUNC1 binds with high affinity and specificity to dipalmitoylphosphatidylcholine, one of the major and most important surfactant phospholipids in the airway and lungs. By lowering the surface tension in mucosal fluids, BPIFA1/SPLUNC1 inhibits bacteria like Klebsiella from proliferating as a biofilm on epithelium. The protein physically interacts with pathogens, causing "bacterial cell coating" that inhibits the epithelial sodium channel of bacteria, makes bacteria like Pseudomonas more permeable, and attracts macrophages and neutrophils for a bactericidal effect. As such, BPIFA1 plays a role in innate immune defense in the airways.

BPIFA1/PLUNC's ability to regulate ENaC is pH-sensitive and fails in acidic cystic fibrosis airways. Thus, defective BPIFA1/PLUNC1 gene function is thought to contribute to the development of lung pathology in cystic fibrosis patients.

It may also serve as a potential molecular marker for detection of micrometastasis in non-small-cell lung cancer.
