= FAM83A =

Protein-coding gene in the species Homo sapiens

Available structures
| PDB | Ortholog search: PDBe RCSB |
| PDB | List of PDB id codes 4URJ |

Identifiers
- Aliases: FAM83A, BJ-TSA-9, family with sequence similarity 83 member A
- External IDs: MGI: 2447773; HomoloGene: 13158; GeneCards: FAM83A; OMA:FAM83A - orthologs

Gene location (Human)
| Chr. | Chromosome 8 (human) |
| Band | 8q24.13 | Start | 123,178,960 bp |
| Band | 8q24.13 | End | 123,210,079 bp |

Gene location (Mouse)
| Chr. | Chromosome 15 (mouse) |
| Band | 15|15 D1 | Start | 57,848,815 bp |
| Band | 15|15 D1 | End | 57,874,405 bp |
RNA expression pattern
| Bgee | Human / Mouse (ortholog); Top expressed in: palpebral conjunctiva; pancreatic ductal cell; gingival epithelium; buccal mucosa cell; tibialis anterior muscle; mucosa of ileum; gonad; nasal epithelium; epithelium of nasopharynx; vagina / Top expressed in: white adipose tissue; lip; uterus; blastocyst; testicle; esophagus; zone of skin; morula; urinary bladder; skeletal muscle tissue; More reference expression data |
| BioGPS | n/a |
Gene ontology
| Molecular function | phosphatidylinositol 3-kinase regulatory subunit binding; protein binding; protein kinase binding |
| Cellular component | cytoplasm |
| Biological process | cell population proliferation; epidermal growth factor receptor signaling pathway |
Sources:Amigo / QuickGO
Orthologs
| Species | Human | Mouse |
| Entrez | 84985 | 239463 |
| Ensembl | ENSG00000147689 | ENSMUSG00000051225 |
| UniProt | Q86UY5 | Q8K2P2 |
| RefSeq (mRNA) | NM_001288587; NM_032899; NM_207006; NM_001321630; NM_001394396 | NM_173862 |
| RefSeq (protein) | NP_001275516; NP_001308559; NP_116288; NP_996889 | NP_776287 |
| Location (UCSC) | Chr 8: 123.18 – 123.21 Mb | Chr 15: 57.85 – 57.87 Mb |
| PubMed search |
- Wikidata
| View/Edit Human | View/Edit Mouse |

Protein FAM83A (family member with sequence similarity 83) also known as tumor antigen BJ-TSA-9 is a protein that in humans is encoded by the FAM83A gene.

This protein is predicted to contain one domain of unknown function 1669 (DUF1669), which places this protein into the PLDc_SuperFamily. It has been linked to be a potential biomarker in lung, prostate, and bladder cancers.

== Gene ==
FAM83A is located on chromosome 8, locus q24.13, and spans 27,566 base pairs. There is a promoter approximately 4,000 base pairs upstream as predicted by the tool ElDorado by Genomatix. Deletions in this part of the chromosome, including the FAM83A gene, often result in Langer–Giedion syndrome.

== mRNA ==
The FAM83A mRNA has 10 different splice forms, with transcript variant 1 being the subject of this article. This mRNA consists of approximately 2,900 base pairs. It contains a domain of unknown function 1669 (DUF1669), and is a member of the PLDc_SF superfamily. It has been placed into this superfamily based on highly similar sequences between FAM83A and other N-terminus phospholipase D-like domains; however, it's missing the functional histidine and therefore only predicted to have a similar structure. Four exons comprise this mRNA. Predictions show several possible RNA stem loop formations in the untranslated regions of the mRNA.

Schematic of the FAM83A protein product showing its major hypothesized and predicted landmarks.

== Protein ==
The FAM83A gene encodes for the FAM83A protein isoform A. This protein is 434 amino acids in length, and weighs approximately 45 kilodaltons. Although the structure is not confirmed, it is predicted using GOR4 to have four alpha helices and five beta sheets, with an isoelectric point of 8.964 There appears to be no signal peptide and is not a transmembrane protein. Using CBLAST, it was observed to share a common sequence with the protein 3H0G, however, not in the predicted functional region of FAM83A. This may still provide valuable information, though, on a possible partial structure for this protein.

== Expression ==
FAM83A is expressed in many different areas of the human body, and at very different levels. EST data suggests that this gene is expressed primarily in adults. It shows significant levels in the mouth and larynx, with other raised expression in the prostate, lung, and esophagus. These normal levels are even more elevated in head and neck tumors, lung tumors, prostate cancers, and bladder carcinomas. Microarray expression data also show different environmental conditions, especially irritants. Such irritants can be cigarette smoke, where FAM83A has been shown to increase expression after 24 hours exposure, and house dust mite extract on bronchial epithelial cells, where FAM83A expression also increases after exposure. FAM83A shows decreased expression when activating transcription factor 2 (ATF2) is knocked out. Since ATF2 was not predicted to bind in the promoter region, it suggests that there is an indirect relationship between FAM83A and ATF2. With increased expression to irritants and allergens along with an indirect relationship with ATF2, it suggests FAM83A may be in a signaling pathway.

Microarray expression data for FAM83A when exposed to cigarette smoke. As seen, after 24 hours, expression levels increase compared to the control.

Microarray expression data for FAM83A when exposed to house dust mite extract. FAM83A expression increases when exposed to this irritant compared to the control.

Microarray expression data for FAM83A when ATF2 is knocked out. As seen, expression levels decrease along with decreased ATF2 levels. Since there is not a hypothesized direct interaction, an indirect interaction is suggested.

== Cancer ==
There are multiple studies that link FAM83A overexpression to lung, prostate, and bladder cancers. Researchers believe that this gene might make a good candidate for early detection of these cancers, especially lung cancer. It is unknown why or how FAM83A is upregulated. Studies have shown that arsenic can acetylate the promoter causing upregulation, suggesting this may be a similar mechanism to how this gene becomes unregulated in cancer.

== Protein interaction ==
FAM83A has been shown to interact with palate, lung, and nasal epithelium carcinoma associated protein (PLUNC) through the STRING tool. This information gathered came from textmining information dealing with cancer.

== Homology ==
FAM83A appears to be a relatively new gene, with BLAST and BLAT only showing orthology back through bony fishes. It is highly conserved through its relatives The DUF1669 domain is the most highly conserved region of the protein, with areas outside of it being more variable. Below is a table of orthologs, noting that this is not a comprehensive list:

| Genus Species | Organism Common Name | Divergence from Humans (MYA) | NCBI Protein Accession Number | Sequence identity | Protein Length |
|---|---|---|---|---|---|
| Homo sapiens | Humans | -- | NM_032899.4 | 100% | 434 |
| Pan troglodytes | Chimpanzee | 6.2 | XP_001147312.2 | 99% | 434 |
| Bos taurus | Cattle | 97.4 | XP_599662.2 | 89% | 435 |
| Canis lupus | Dog | 97.4 | XP_851601.2 | 89% | 435 |
| Mus musculus | Mouse | 91 | NP_776287.2 | 87% | 436 |
| Anolis carolinensis | Lizard | 324.5 | XP_003228186.1 | 70% | 438 |
| Gallus gallus | Chicken | 324.5 | XP_001233861.2 | 69% | 439 |
| Xenopus laevis | Frog | 361.2 | NP_001079963.1 | 64% | 443 |
| Danio rerio | Zebrafish | 454.6 | XP_001340276.3 | 59% | 426 |
