= Lipid-binding serum glycoprotein =

Protein family

LBP / BPI / CETP family, N-terminal domain
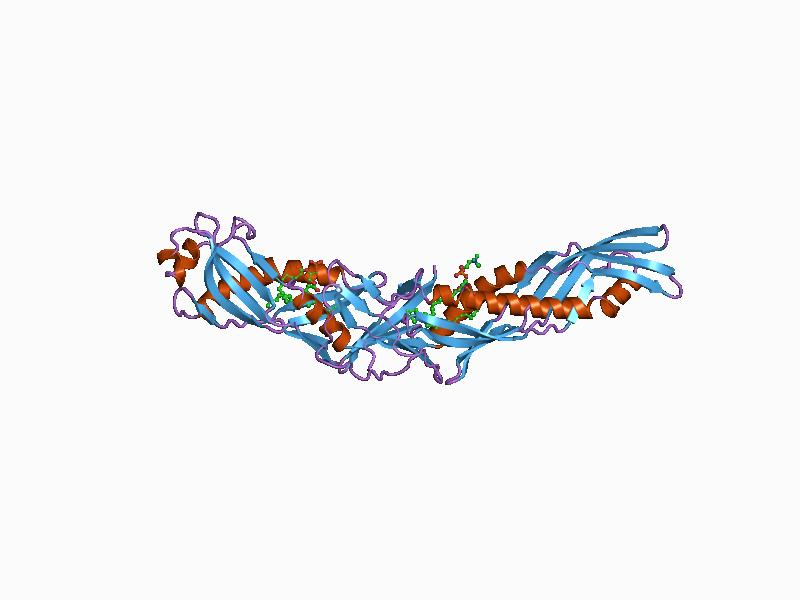
- crystal structure of bpi, the human bactericidal permeability-increasing protein

Identifiers
- Symbol: LBP_BPI_CETP
- Pfam: PF01273
- InterPro: IPR017942
- PROSITE: PDOC00367
- SCOP2: 1bp1 / SCOPe / SUPFAM
- TCDB: 1.C.40
- OPM superfamily: 170
- OPM protein: 2obd
Available protein structures:
- PDB: IPR017942 PF01273 (ECOD; PDBsum)
- AlphaFold: IPR017942; PF01273

LBP / BPI / CETP family, C-terminal domain
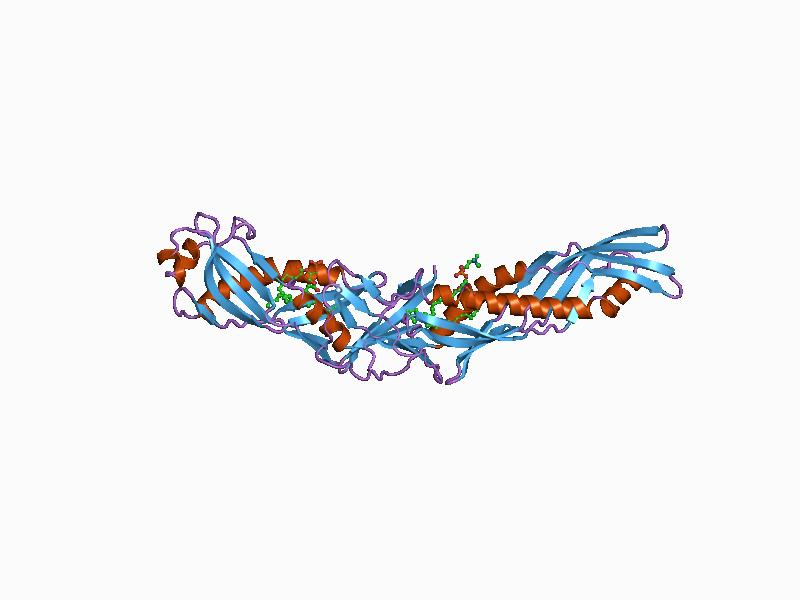
- crystal structure of bpi, the human bactericidal permeability-increasing protein

Identifiers
- Symbol: LBP_BPI_CETP_C
- Pfam: PF02886
- InterPro: IPR001124
- PROSITE: PDOC00367
- SCOP2: 1bp1 / SCOPe / SUPFAM
- TCDB: 1.C.40
Available protein structures:
- PDB: IPR001124 PF02886 (ECOD; PDBsum)
- AlphaFold: IPR001124; PF02886

In molecular biology, the lipid-binding serum glycoproteins family, also known as the BPI/LBP/Plunc family or LBP/BPI/CETP family represents a family which includes mammalian lipid-binding serum glycoproteins and/or proteins containing a structural motif known as the BPI fold. Members of this family include:

- Bactericidal permeability-increasing protein (BPI)
- Lipopolysaccharide-binding protein (LBP)
- Cholesteryl ester transfer protein (CETP)
- Phospholipid transfer protein (PLTP)
- Palate, lung and nasal epithelium carcinoma-associated protein (PLUNC)

== Structure ==
These proteins consist of N- and C-terminal domains, which share a similar two-layer alpha/beta structure, but show little sequence identity to each other. These domains were first described as being arranged in a "boomerang" shape that creates the BPI fold. The fold contains apolar binding pockets that can interact with hydrophobic and amphipathic molecules, such as the acyl carbon chains of lipopolysaccharide found on Gram-negative bacteria.

== Family Members ==
=== Bactericidal permeability-increasing protein ===
Bactericidal permeability-increasing protein (BPI) is a potent antimicrobial protein of 456 amino acids that binds to and neutralises lipopolysaccharides from the outer membrane of Gram-negative bacteria. BPI contains two domains that adopt the same structural fold, even though they have little sequence similarity.

=== Lipopolysaccharide-binding protein ===
Lipopolysaccharide-binding protein (LBP) is an endotoxin-binding protein that is closely related to, and functions in a co-ordinated manner with BPI to facilitate an integrated host response to invading Gram-negative bacteria.

=== Cholesteryl ester transfer protein ===
Cholesteryl ester transfer protein (CETP) is a glycoprotein that facilitates the transfer of lipids (cholesteryl esters and triglycerides) between the different lipoproteins that transport them through plasma, including HDL, LDL, VLDL and chylomicrons. These lipoproteins shield the lipids from water by encapsulating them within a coating of polar lipids and proteins.

=== Phospholipid transfer protein ===
Phospholipid transfer protein (PLTP) exchanges phospholipids between lipoproteins and remodels high-density lipoproteins (HDLs).

=== Palate, lung and nasal epithelium carcinoma-associated protein ===
Palate, lung and nasal epithelium carcinoma-associated protein (PLUNC) is a potential host defensive protein that is secreted from the submucosal gland to the saliva and nasal lavage fluid. PLUNC appears to be a secreted product of neutrophil granules that participates in an aspect of the inflammatory response that contributes to host defence.

Short palate, lung and nasal epithelium clone 1 (SPLUNC1) may bind the lipopolysaccharide of Gram-negative nanobacteria, thereby playing an important role in the host defence of nasopharyngeal epithelium.

Bacterial permeability family member A1 (BPIFA1/SPLUNC1) is an innate protein that is secreted basolaterally from healthy, but not asthmatic, human bronchial epithelial cultures (HBECs). It suppresses airway smooth muscle contractility by binding to and inhibiting the Ca2+ influx channel Orai1.

== Human proteins belonging to this family ==
- Bactericidal permeability-increasing protein (BPI)
- BPI fold-containing family A member 1 (BPIFA1, PLUNC, SPLUNC1, SPURT)
- BPI fold-containing family A member 2 (BPIFA2, SPLUNC2)
- BPI fold-containing family A member 3 (BPIFA3, SPLUNC3)
- BPI fold-containing family B member 1 (BPIFB1, LPLUNC1)
- BPI fold-containing family B member 2 (BPIFB2, LPLUNC2, BPIL1)
- BPI fold-containing family B member 3 (BPIFB3, LPLUNC3)
- BPI fold-containing family B member 4 (BPIFB4, LPLUNC4)
- BPI fold-containing family B member 6 (BPIFB6, LPLUNC6, BPIL3)
- BPI fold-containing family C protein (BPIFC, BPIL2),
- Cholesteryl ester transfer protein
- Latherin (LATH, BPIFA4P)
- Lipopolysaccharide-binding protein (LBP)
- Phospholipid transfer protein (PLTP)
