= Apolipoprotein A-II =

Protein found in humans

APOA2
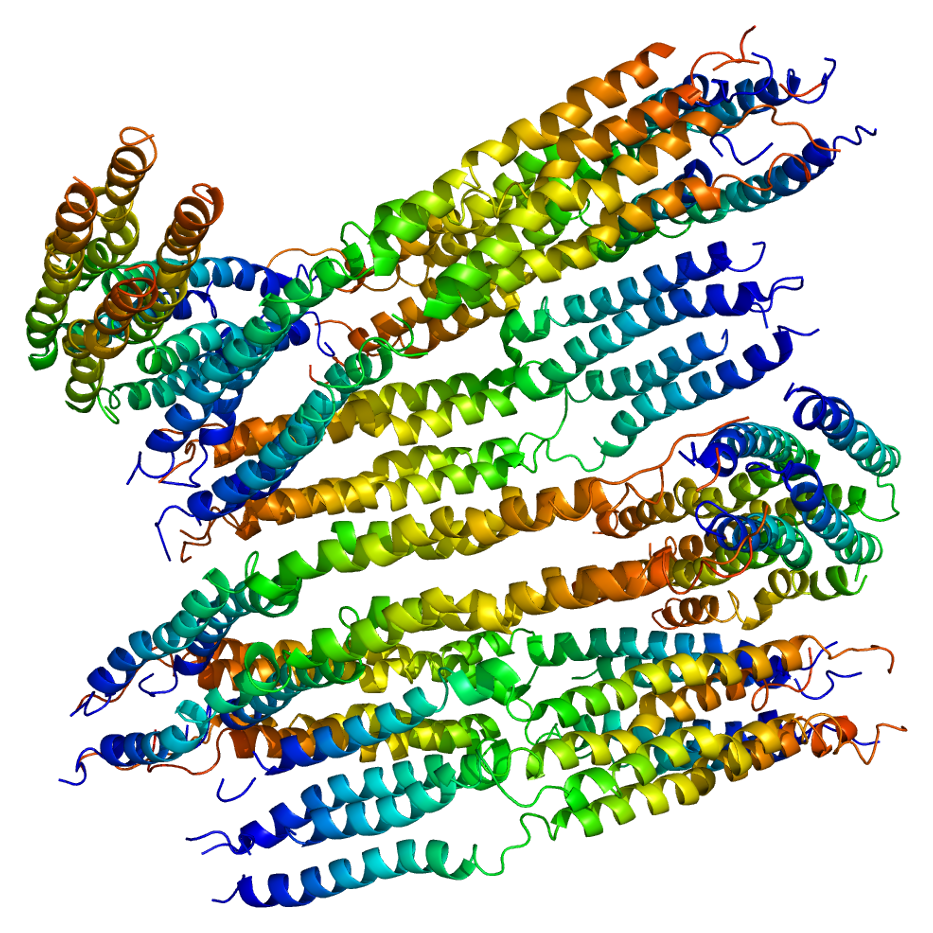

Identifiers
- Aliases: APOA2, Apo-AII, ApoA-II, apoAII, Apolipoprotein A2
- External IDs: OMIM: 107670; MGI: 88050; GeneCards: APOA2
Available structures
PDB	Ortholog search: PDBe RCSB
PDB	List of PDB id codes 1L6L, 2OU1

Gene location (Human)
Chr.	Chromosome 1 (human)
Band	1q23.3	Start	161,222,292 bp
Band	1q23.3	End	161,223,631 bp

Gene location (Mouse)
Chr.	Chromosome 1 (mouse)
Band	1 H3|1 79.22 cM	Start	171,052,623 bp
Band	1 H3|1 79.22 cM	End	171,053,948 bp
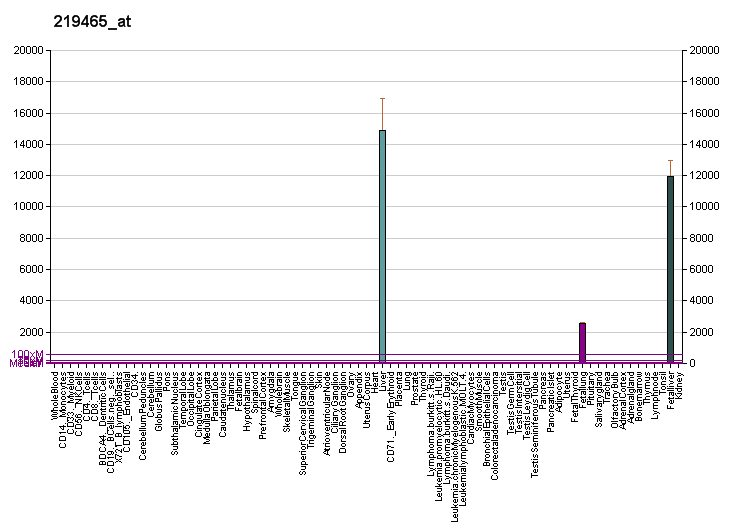

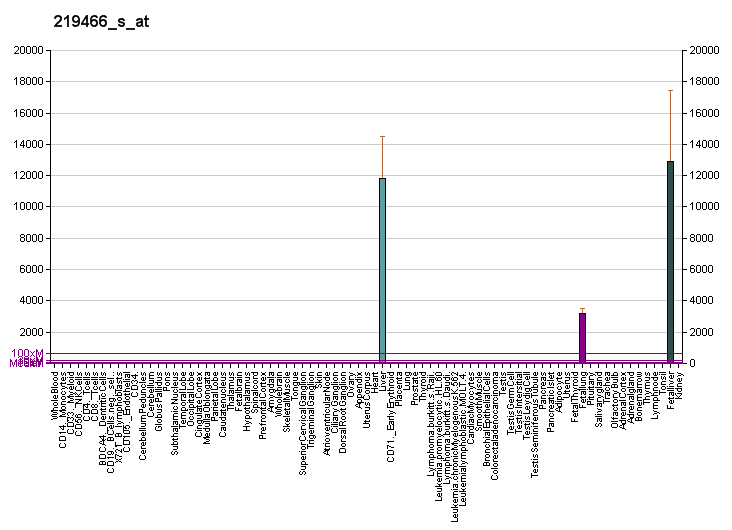
RNA expression pattern
Bgee	Human / Mouse (ortholog); Top expressed in: right lobe of liver; epithelium of colon; testicle; monocyte; gonad; bone marrow cell; granulocyte; left uterine tube; tendon of biceps brachii; blood / Top expressed in: left lobe of liver; yolk sac; fetal liver hematopoietic progenitor cell; human fetus; abdominal wall; right kidney; embryo; blastocyst; proximal tubule; sexually immature organism; More reference expression data
BioGPS	More reference expression data
Gene ontology
Molecular function	lipase inhibitor activity; protein homodimerization activity; phosphatidylcholine binding; lipid transporter activity; apolipoprotein receptor binding; high-density lipoprotein particle receptor binding; cholesterol binding; protein binding; protein heterodimerization activity; phosphatidylcholine-sterol O-acyltransferase activator activity; phospholipid binding; cholesterol transfer activity; lipid binding; high-density lipoprotein particle binding; heat shock protein binding; signaling receptor binding
Cellular component	cytosol; blood microparticle; endoplasmic reticulum lumen; chylomicron; very-low-density lipoprotein particle; spherical high-density lipoprotein particle; extracellular region; early endosome; high-density lipoprotein particle; extracellular exosome; extracellular space
Biological process	negative regulation of cholesterol import; negative regulation of very-low-density lipoprotein particle remodeling; diacylglycerol catabolic process; lipid transport; regulation of protein stability; positive regulation of cholesterol esterification; phospholipid efflux; cholesterol transport; positive regulation of lipid catabolic process; response to glucocorticoid; negative regulation of cytokine production involved in immune response; response to glucose; high-density lipoprotein particle assembly; retinoid metabolic process; response to estrogen; high-density lipoprotein particle remodeling; negative regulation of lipase activity; regulation of intestinal cholesterol absorption; low-density lipoprotein particle remodeling; acute inflammatory response; animal organ regeneration; phospholipid catabolic process; peptidyl-methionine modification; cholesterol efflux; negative regulation of cholesterol transport; cholesterol homeostasis; phosphatidylcholine biosynthetic process; negative regulation of cholesterol transporter activity; viral process; negative regulation of lipid catabolic process; triglyceride-rich lipoprotein particle remodeling; triglyceride metabolic process; reverse cholesterol transport; high-density lipoprotein particle clearance; positive regulation of catalytic activity; cholesterol metabolic process; regulation of lipid metabolic process; chylomicron remodeling; chylomicron assembly; lipoprotein metabolic process; post-translational protein modification; transport; positive regulation of phagocytosis; protein stabilization
Sources:Amigo / QuickGO
Orthologs
Databases	NCBI: entry; OMA: entry
Species	Human	Mouse
Entrez	336	11807
Ensembl	ENSG00000158874	ENSMUSG00000005681
UniProt	P02652	P09813
RefSeq (mRNA)	NM_001643	NM_013474; NM_001305549; NM_001305550; NM_001305585
RefSeq (protein)	NP_001634	NP_001292478; NP_001292479; NP_001292514; NP_038502
Location (UCSC)	Chr 1: 161.22 – 161.22 Mb	Chr 1: 171.05 – 171.05 Mb
PubMed search
- Wikidata
View/Edit Human	View/Edit Mouse

ApoA-II
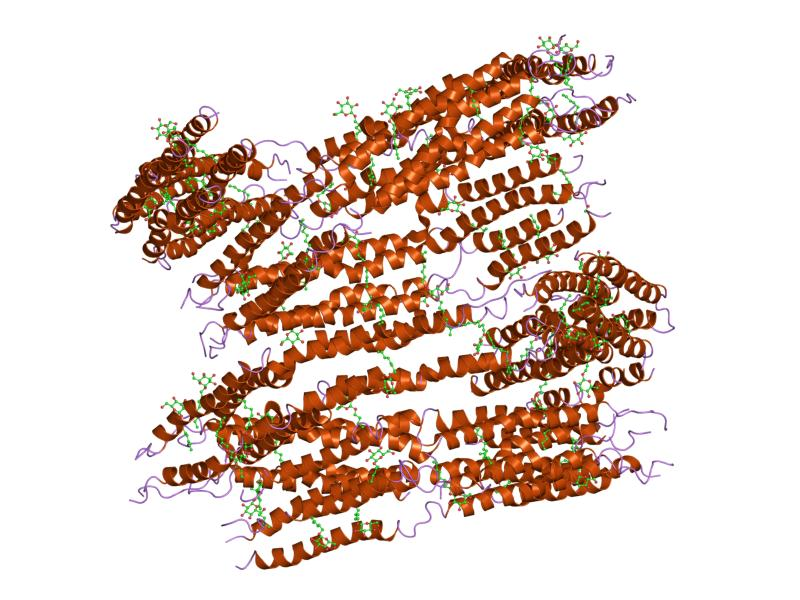
- structures of apolipoprotein a-ii and a lipid surrogate complex provide insights into apolipoprotein-lipid interactions

Identifiers
- Symbol: ApoA-II
- Pfam: PF04711
- InterPro: IPR006801
- SCOP2: 1l6k / SCOPe / SUPFAM
Available protein structures:
- PDB: IPR006801 PF04711 (ECOD; PDBsum)
- AlphaFold: IPR006801; PF04711

Apolipoprotein A-II is a protein that in humans is encoded by the APOA2 gene. It is the second most abundant protein of the high density lipoprotein particles. The protein is found in plasma as a monomer, homodimer, or heterodimer with apolipoprotein D. ApoA-II regulates many steps in HDL metabolism, and its role in coronary heart disease is unclear. Defects in this gene may result in apolipoprotein A-II deficiency or hypercholesterolemia.

== Interactions ==
ApoA-II has been shown to interact with phospholipid transfer protein.

== Interactive pathway map ==
Click on genes, proteins and metabolites below to link to respective articles. (Note: The interactive pathway map can be edited at WikiPathways: "Statin_Pathway_WP430".)

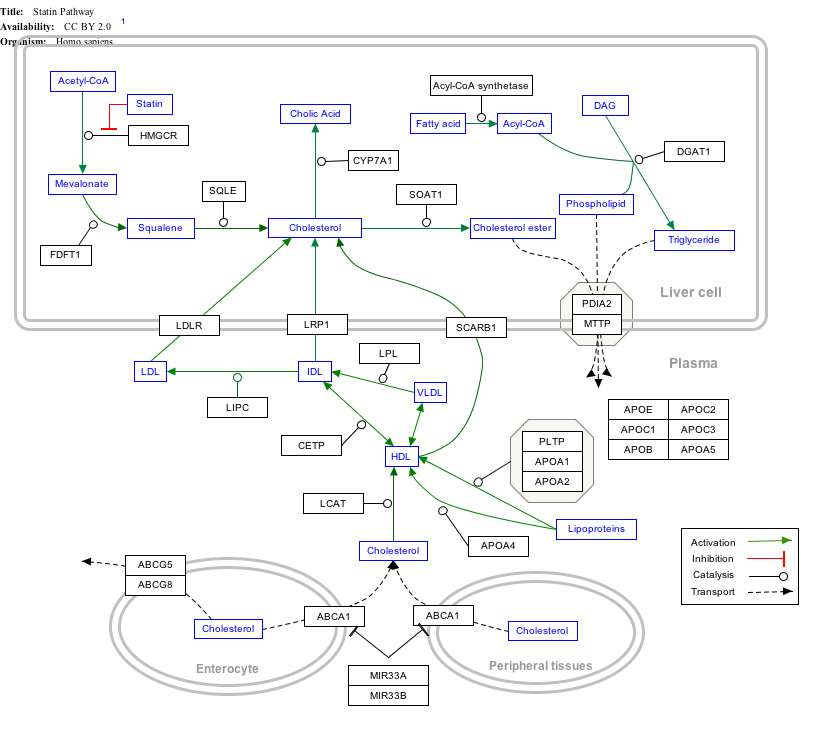

Statin pathway edit
