= Peter Elsbach =

Dutch physician (1924–2020)

Peter Elsbach (9 November 1924 – 10 May 2020) was a Dutch physician. He was professor of medicine at the New York University School of Medicine. He specialized in biochemistry, infectious diseases and natural anti-bacterial host defense.

== Life ==
Elsbach was born on 9 November 1924 in Zeist. He spent his youth in the Dutch East Indies and during World War II was made prisoner by the Japanese. In 1950 he obtained a degree in medicine from the University of Amsterdam. The next three years he was an intern at the local hospital. In 1953 he moved to the United States where he started residency training at the New York University School of Medicine. From 1956 to 1959 he did clinical fellowships at Rockefeller University. After returning to the New York University School of Medicine in 1959, he obtained his PhD in Medical Sciences from Leiden University in 1964 with his dissertation Uptake of Lipid by Phagocytic Cells. An Examination of the Role of Phagocytosis. Elsbach worked for the New York University School of Medicine for more than 40 years.

Elsbach was elected a corresponding member of the Royal Netherlands Academy of Arts and Sciences in 1979. He received an honorary degree from Lund University in 1993. In 2008 he received honorary life membership of the International Endotoxin and Innate Immunity Society. Elsbach was a member of the American Society for Clinical Investigation.

Elsbach died on 10 May 2020 at the age of 95.
