= GALNT14 =

Protein-coding gene in the species Homo sapiens

Identifiers
- Aliases: GALNT14, GALNT15, GalNac-T10, GalNac-T14, polypeptide N-acetylgalactosaminyltransferase 14
- External IDs: OMIM: 608225; MGI: 1918935; GeneCards: GALNT14
Enzyme activity
| EC # | BRENDA | ExPASy | KEGG | MetaCyc |
|---|---|---|---|---|
| 2.4.1.41 | ↗ | ↗ | ↗ | ↗ |

Gene location (Human)
| Chr. | Chromosome 2 (human) |
| Band | 2p23.1 | Start | 30,910,467 bp |
| Band | 2p23.1 | End | 31,155,202 bp |
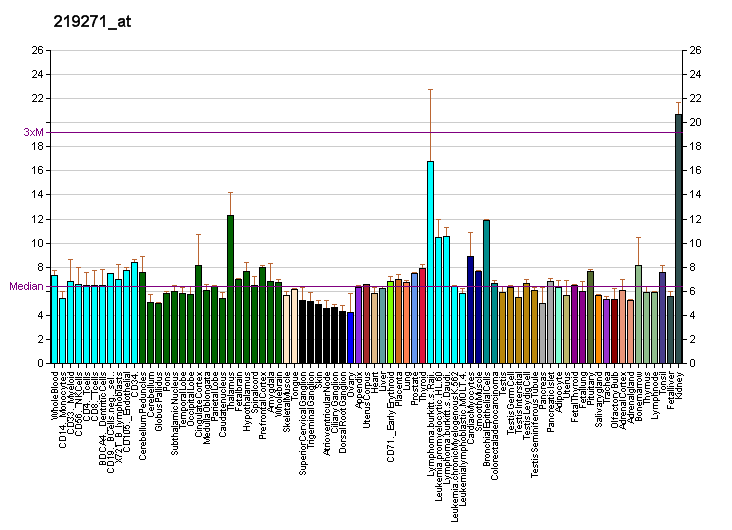
RNA expression pattern
| Bgee | Human / Mouse (ortholog); Top expressed in: kidney tubule; renal medulla; human kidney; nasal epithelium; glomerulus; lateral nuclear group of thalamus; metanephric glomerulus; endothelial cell; epithelium of esophagus; periodontal fiber / n/a; More reference expression data |
| BioGPS | More reference expression data |
Gene ontology
| Molecular function | glycosyltransferase activity; transferase activity; metal ion binding; carbohydrate binding; polypeptide N-acetylgalactosaminyltransferase activity |
| Cellular component | integral component of membrane; Golgi apparatus; membrane; Golgi membrane |
| Biological process | protein glycosylation; O-glycan processing |
Sources:Amigo / QuickGO
Orthologs
| Databases | NCBI: entry; OMA: entry |
| Species | Human | Mouse |
| Entrez | 79623 | 71685 |
| Ensembl | ENSG00000158089 | n/a |
| UniProt | Q96FL9 | Q8BVG5 |
| RefSeq (mRNA) | NM_001253826; NM_001253827; NM_024572; NM_001329095; NM_001329096 NM_001329097 | NM_027864 |
| RefSeq (protein) | NP_001240755; NP_001240756; NP_001316024; NP_001316025; NP_001316026 NP_078848 | NP_082140 |
| Location (UCSC) | Chr 2: 30.91 – 31.16 Mb | n/a |
| PubMed search |
- Wikidata
| View/Edit Human | View/Edit Mouse |

Polypeptide N-acetylgalactosaminyltransferase 14 is an enzyme that in humans is encoded by the GALNT14 gene.

GALNT14 (EC 2.4.1.41) belongs to a large subfamily of glycosyltransferases residing in the Golgi apparatus. GALNT enzymes catalyze the first step in the O-glycosylation of mammalian proteins by transferring N-acetyl-D-galactosamine (GalNAc) to peptide substrates.[supplied by OMIM]

SNPs on GALNT14 have been shown to be associated to the chemotherapy responses of patients with advanced hepatocellular carcinoma.
