= Phospholipid transfer protein =

Mammalian protein found in Homo sapiens

PLTP

Identifiers
- Aliases: PLTP, BPIFE, HDLCQ9, phospholipid transfer protein
- External IDs: MGI: 103151; GeneCards: PLTP

Gene location (Human)
Chr.	Chromosome 20 (human)
Band	20q13.12	Start	45,898,621 bp
Band	20q13.12	End	45,912,155 bp

Gene location (Mouse)
Chr.	Chromosome 2 (mouse)
Band	2 H3|2 85.27 cM	Start	164,681,438 bp
Band	2 H3|2 85.27 cM	End	164,699,631 bp
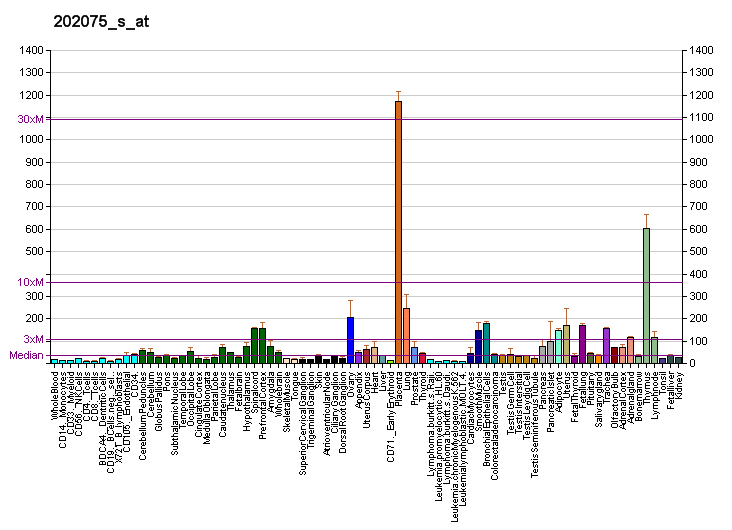
RNA expression pattern
Bgee	Human / Mouse (ortholog); Top expressed in: right coronary artery; right adrenal cortex; gastric mucosa; gallbladder; right ovary; body of pancreas; canal of the cervix; left adrenal gland; left ovary; left coronary artery / Top expressed in: retinal pigment epithelium; right lung lobe; habenula; molar; left lung; left lung lobe; choroid plexus of fourth ventricle; cerebellar vermis; lobe of cerebellum; dorsal tegmental nucleus; More reference expression data
BioGPS	More reference expression data
Gene ontology
Molecular function	lipid binding; lipid transporter activity; phospholipid transporter activity; phosphatidylethanolamine binding; phosphatidylcholine transporter activity; diacylglycerol binding; phosphatidylcholine binding; phosphatidic acid binding; ceramide binding; phosphatidylglycerol binding; phosphatidylethanolamine transfer activity; phosphatidic acid transfer activity
Cellular component	extracellular region; extracellular space; high-density lipoprotein particle
Biological process	high-density lipoprotein particle remodeling; flagellated sperm motility; positive regulation of cholesterol efflux; vitamin E biosynthetic process; lipid metabolism; transport; lipid transport; phospholipid transport; ceramide transport
Sources:Amigo / QuickGO
Orthologs
Databases	NCBI: entry; OMA: entry
Species	Human	Mouse
Entrez	5360	18830
Ensembl	ENSG00000100979	ENSMUSG00000017754
UniProt	P55058	P55065
RefSeq (mRNA)	NM_182676; NM_001242920; NM_001242921; NM_006227	NM_011125
RefSeq (protein)	NP_001229849; NP_001229850; NP_006218; NP_872617	NP_035255
Location (UCSC)	Chr 20: 45.9 – 45.91 Mb	Chr 2: 164.68 – 164.7 Mb
PubMed search
- Wikidata
View/Edit Human	View/Edit Mouse

Phospholipid transfer protein is a protein that in humans is encoded by the PLTP gene.

== Function ==
The protein encoded by this gene is one of at least two lipid transfer proteins found in human plasma. The encoded protein transfers phospholipids from triglyceride-rich lipoproteins to high density lipoprotein (HDL). In addition to regulating the size of HDL particles, this protein may be involved in cholesterol metabolism. At least two transcript variants encoding different isoforms have been found for this gene.

== Interactions ==
PLTP has been shown to interact with Apolipoprotein A1 and APOA2.

== Interactive pathway map ==
Click on genes, proteins and metabolites below to link to respective articles. (Note: The interactive pathway map can be edited at WikiPathways: "Statin_Pathway_WP430".)

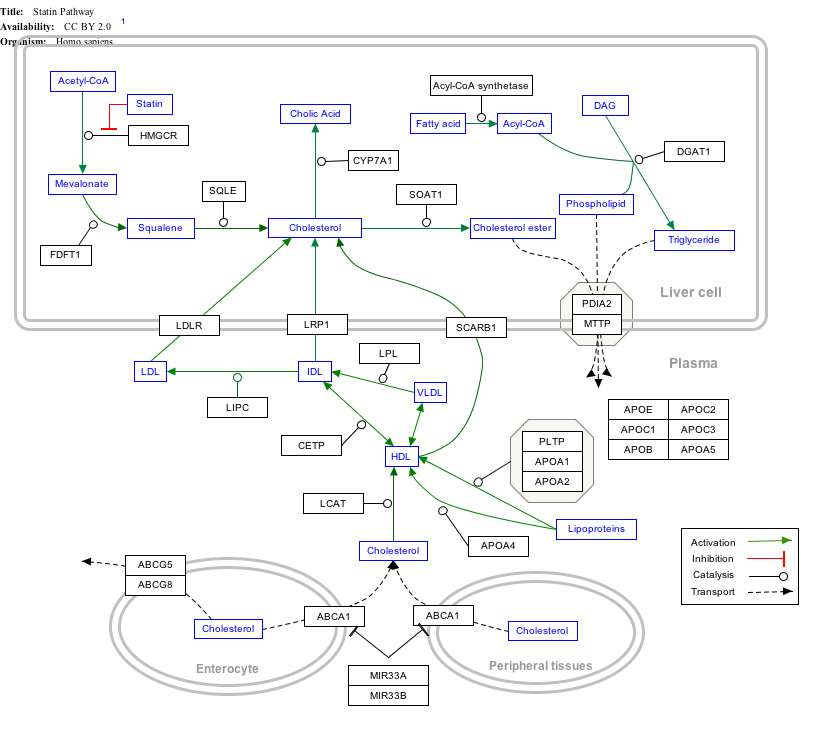

Statin pathway edit
