= Cholesteryl ester transfer protein =

Mammalian protein found in Homo sapiens

CETP
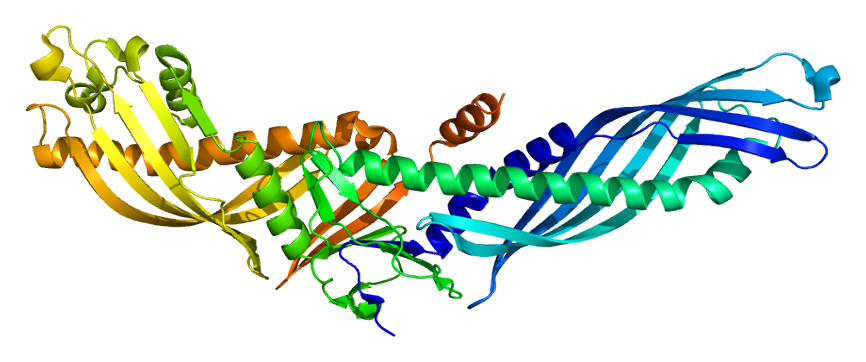

Identifiers
- Aliases: CETP, BPIFF, HDLCQ10, cholesteryl ester transfer protein
- External IDs: OMIM: 118470; GeneCards: CETP
Available structures
PDB	Human UniProt search: PDBe RCSB
PDB	List of PDB id codes 4F2A, 2OBD, 4EWS

Gene location (Human)
Chr.	Chromosome 16 (human)
Band	16q13	Start	56,961,923 bp
Band	16q13	End	56,983,845 bp
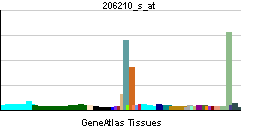
RNA expression pattern
Bgee	Human / Mouse (ortholog); Top expressed in: lymph node; spleen; liver; testicle; right lobe of liver; monocyte; gallbladder; left lobe of thyroid gland; appendix; right lobe of thyroid gland / n/a; More reference expression data
BioGPS	More reference expression data
Gene ontology
Molecular function	triglyceride binding; phosphatidylcholine binding; lipid transporter activity; phospholipid transporter activity; cholesterol binding; cholesterol transfer activity; lipid binding
Cellular component	vesicle; extracellular region; high-density lipoprotein particle; extracellular exosome; extracellular space
Biological process	steroid metabolic process; phospholipid homeostasis; lipid transport; lipid metabolism; phospholipid transport; cholesterol transport; cholesterol metabolic process; regulation of cholesterol efflux; lipid homeostasis; very-low-density lipoprotein particle remodeling; triglyceride transport; cholesterol homeostasis; phosphatidylcholine metabolic process; triglyceride metabolic process; negative regulation of macrophage derived foam cell differentiation; triglyceride homeostasis; reverse cholesterol transport; low-density lipoprotein particle remodeling; high-density lipoprotein particle remodeling; transport
Sources:Amigo / QuickGO
Orthologs
Databases	NCBI: entry; OMA: entry
Species	Human	Mouse
Entrez	1071	n/a
Ensembl	ENSG00000087237	n/a
UniProt	P11597	n/a
RefSeq (mRNA)	NM_000078; NM_001286085	n/a
RefSeq (protein)	NP_000069; NP_001273014	n/a
Location (UCSC)	Chr 16: 56.96 – 56.98 Mb	n/a
PubMed search		n/a
- Wikidata
View/Edit Human

Cholesteryl ester transfer protein (CETP), also called plasma lipid transfer protein, is a plasma protein that facilitates the transport of cholesteryl esters and triglycerides between the lipoproteins. It collects triglycerides from very-low-density lipoproteins (VLDL) or chylomicrons and exchanges them for cholesteryl esters from high-density lipoproteins (HDL), and vice versa. Most of the time, however, CETP does a heteroexchange, trading a triglyceride for a cholesteryl ester or a cholesteryl ester for a triglyceride.

== Genetics ==
The CETP gene is located on chromosome 16 (16q21).

== Protein fold ==
The crystal structure of CETP is that of dimer of two tubular lipid (TULIP) binding domains. Each domain consists of a core of six elements: four beta-sheets forming an extended superhelix and two flanking elements that tend to include some alpha helices. The sheets wrap around the helices to produce a cylinder 6 x 2.5 x 2.5 nm. CETP contains two of these domains that interact head-to-head via an interface made of six beta-sheets, three from each protomer. The same fold is shared by bacterial permeability inducing proteins (such as BPIFP1 BPIFP2, BPIFA3, and BPIFB4), phospholipid transfer protein (PLTP), and long-palate lung, and nasal epithelium protein (L-PLUNC). The fold is similar to intracellular SMP domains, and originated in bacteria. The crystal structure of CETP has been obtained with bound CETP inhibitors. However, this has not resolved the doubt over whether CETP function as a lipid tube or shuttle.

== Role in disease ==
Rare mutations leading to reduced function of CETP have been linked to accelerated atherosclerosis. In contrast, a polymorphism (I405V) of the CETP gene leading to lower serum levels has also been linked to exceptional longevity and to metabolic response to nutritional intervention. However, this mutation also increases the prevalence of coronary heart disease in patients with hypertriglyceridemia. The D442G mutation, which lowers CETP levels and increases HDL levels also increases coronary heart disease.

Elaidic acid, a common type of trans fat, increases CETP activity.

== Pharmacology ==
As HDL can alleviate atherosclerosis and other cardiovascular diseases, and certain disease states such as the metabolic syndrome feature low HDL, pharmacological inhibition of CETP is being studied as a method of improving HDL levels. To be specific, in a 2004 study, the small molecular agent torcetrapib was shown to increase HDL levels, alone and with a statin, and lower LDL when co-administered with a statin. Studies into cardiovascular endpoints, however, were largely disappointing. While they confirmed the change in lipid levels, most reported an increase in blood pressure, no change in atherosclerosis, and, in a trial of a combination of torcetrapib and atorvastatin, an increase in cardiovascular events and mortality.

A compound related to torcetrapib, dalcetrapib (investigative name JTT-705/R1658), was also studied, but trials have ceased. It increases HDL levels by 30%, as compared to 60% by torcetrapib. Two CETP inhibitors were previously under development. One was Merck's MK-0859 anacetrapib, which in initial studies did not increase blood pressure. In 2017, its development was abandoned by Merck. The other was Eli Lilly's evacetrapib, which failed in Phase 3 trials.

== Interactive pathway map ==
Click on genes, proteins and metabolites below to link to respective articles. (Note: The interactive pathway map can be edited at WikiPathways: "Statin_Pathway_WP430".)

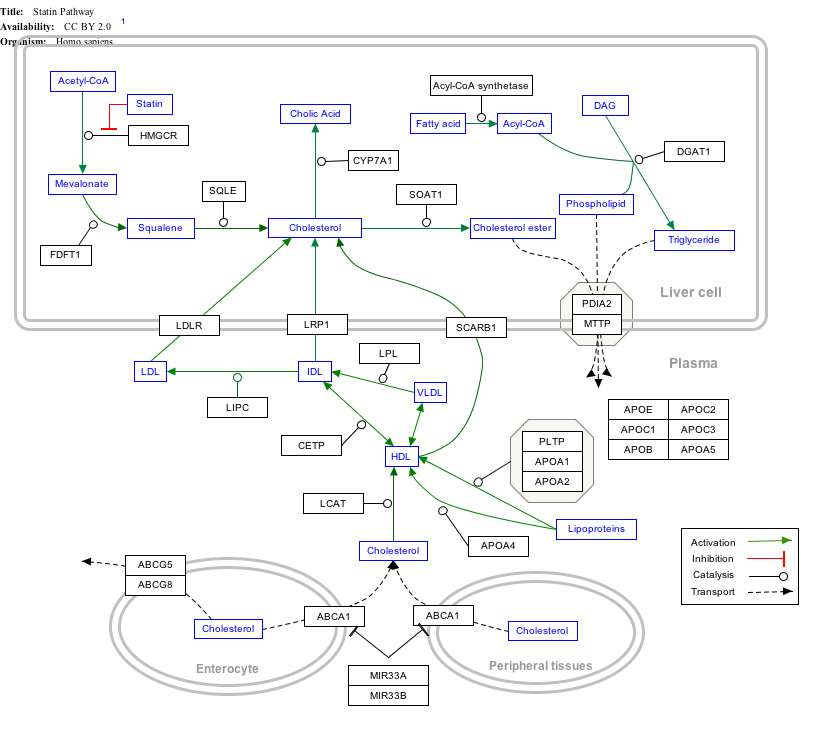

Statin pathway edit
