= Lipopolysaccharide binding protein =

Protein in humans

LBP
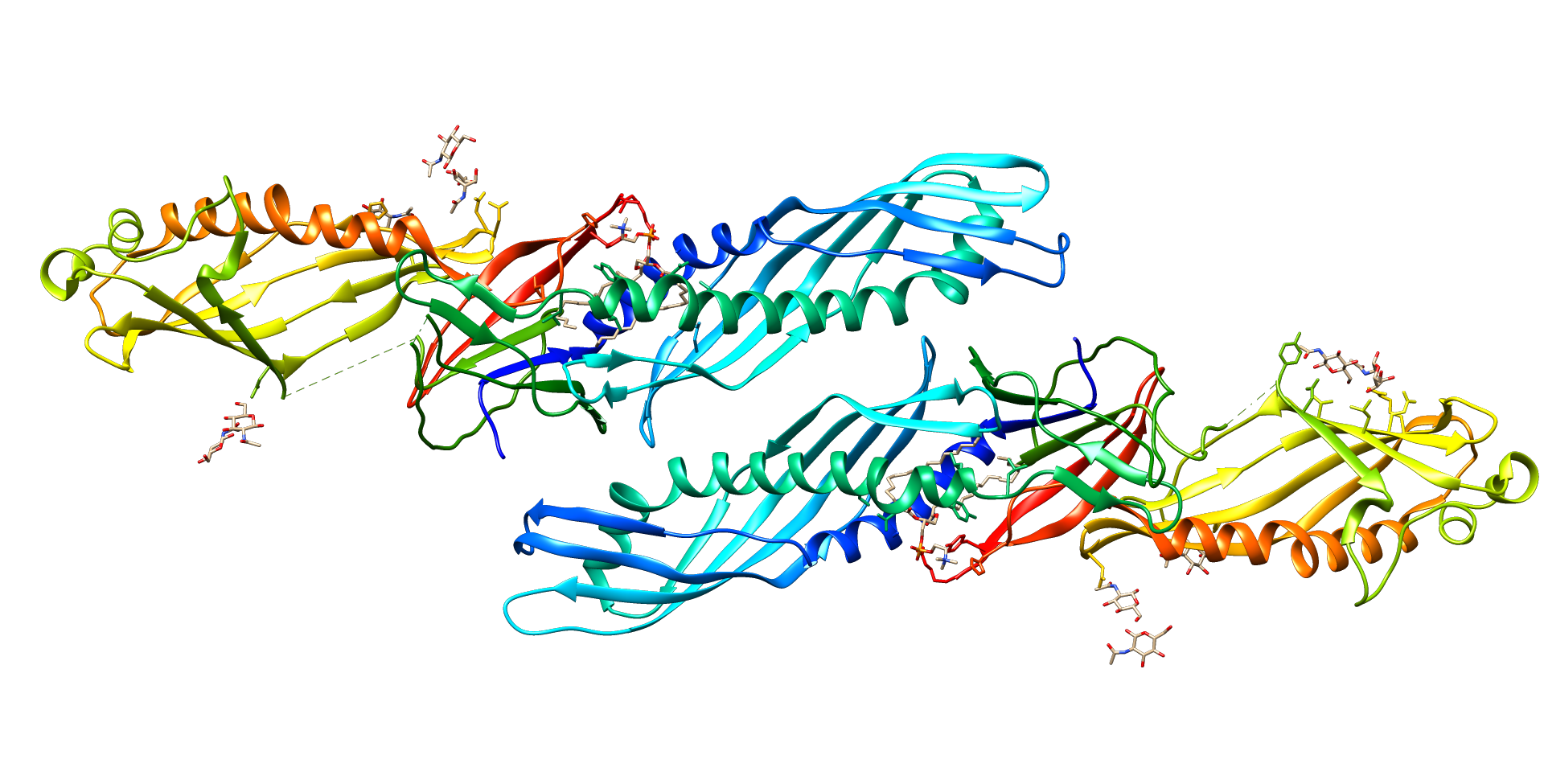

Identifiers
- Aliases: LBP, BPIFD2, lipopolysaccharide binding protein
- External IDs: OMIM: 151990; MGI: 1098776; GeneCards: LBP
Available structures
PDB	Ortholog search: PDBe RCSB
PDB	List of PDB id codes 4M4D

Gene location (Human)
Chr.	Chromosome 20 (human)
Band	20q11.23	Start	38,346,482 bp
Band	20q11.23	End	38,377,013 bp

Gene location (Mouse)
Chr.	Chromosome 2 (mouse)
Band	2 H1|2 78.72 cM	Start	158,148,413 bp
Band	2 H1|2 78.72 cM	End	158,174,772 bp
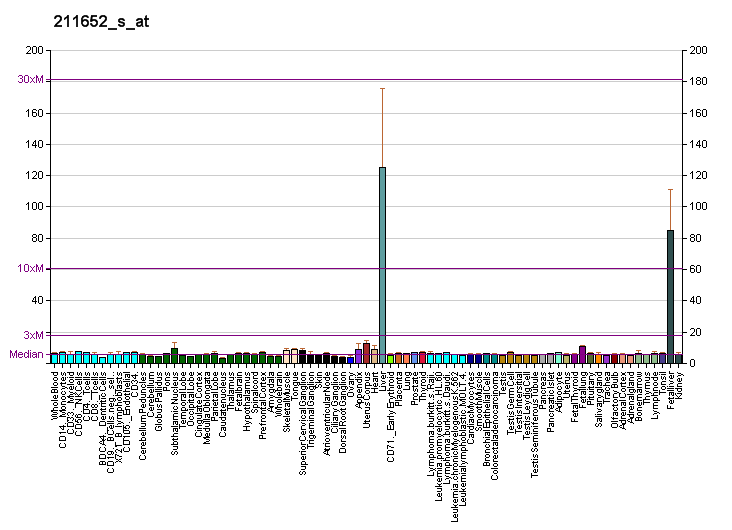

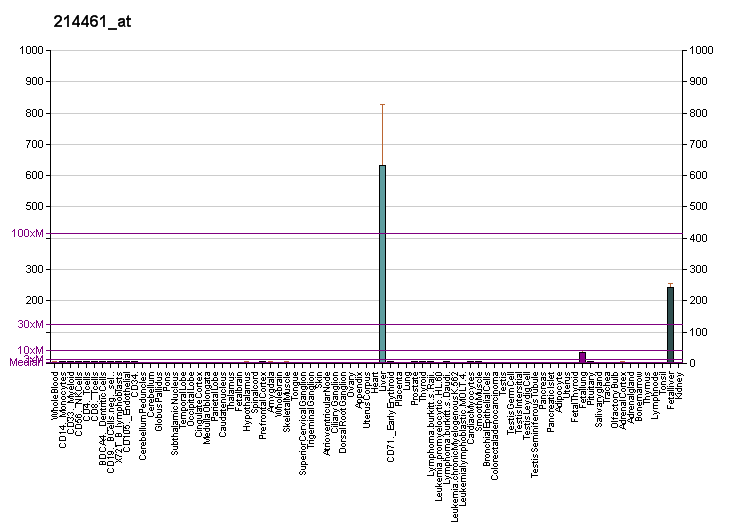
RNA expression pattern
Bgee	Human / Mouse (ortholog); Top expressed in: right lobe of liver; testicle; tibialis anterior muscle; gastrocnemius muscle; muscle of thigh; appendix; deltoid muscle; subcutaneous adipose tissue; glutes; right lobe of thyroid gland / Top expressed in: gastrula; choroid plexus of fourth ventricle; decidua; Epithelium of choroid plexus; lumbar spinal ganglion; ankle; ankle joint; stroma of bone marrow; left lobe of liver; uterus; More reference expression data
BioGPS	More reference expression data
Gene ontology
Molecular function	lipoteichoic acid binding; protein binding; lipid binding; signaling receptor binding; lipopolysaccharide binding; lipopeptide binding
Cellular component	membrane; extracellular exosome; extracellular region; cell surface; extracellular space
Biological process	detection of molecule of bacterial origin; lipid transport; toll-like receptor 4 signaling pathway; immune system process; leukocyte chemotaxis involved in inflammatory response; cellular defense response; cellular response to lipoteichoic acid; defense response to bacterium; lipopolysaccharide transport; positive regulation of interleukin-8 production; positive regulation of interleukin-6 production; positive regulation of neutrophil chemotaxis; positive regulation of toll-like receptor 4 signaling pathway; positive regulation of chemokine production; negative regulation of tumor necrosis factor production; lipopolysaccharide-mediated signaling pathway; opsonization; defense response to Gram-negative bacterium; positive regulation of tumor necrosis factor production; response to lipopolysaccharide; macrophage activation involved in immune response; positive regulation of respiratory burst involved in inflammatory response; acute-phase response; innate immune response; defense response to Gram-positive bacterium; cellular response to lipopolysaccharide; positive regulation of macrophage activation; toll-like receptor signaling pathway; macromolecule localization; positive regulation of cytolysis; transport; cytokine-mediated signaling pathway
Sources:Amigo / QuickGO
Orthologs
Databases	NCBI: entry; OMA: entry
Species	Human	Mouse
Entrez	3929	16803
Ensembl	ENSG00000129988	ENSMUSG00000016024
UniProt	P18428	Q61805
RefSeq (mRNA)	NM_004139	NM_008489
RefSeq (protein)	NP_004130	NP_032515
Location (UCSC)	Chr 20: 38.35 – 38.38 Mb	Chr 2: 158.15 – 158.17 Mb
PubMed search
- Wikidata
View/Edit Human	View/Edit Mouse

Lipopolysaccharide binding protein (LBP) is a protein that in humans is encoded by the LBP gene.

LBP is a soluble acute-phase protein that binds to bacterial lipopolysaccharide (or LPS) to elicit immune responses by presenting the LPS to important cell surface pattern recognition receptors called CD14 and TLR4.

The protein encoded by this gene is involved in the acute-phase immunologic response to gram-negative bacterial infections. Gram-negative bacteria contain a glycolipid, lipopolysaccharide (LPS), on their outer cell wall. Together with bactericidal permeability-increasing protein (BPI), the encoded protein binds LPS and interacts with the CD14 receptor, probably playing a role in regulating LPS-dependent monocyte responses. Studies in mice suggest that the encoded protein is necessary for the rapid acute-phase response to LPS but not for the clearance of LPS from circulation. This protein is part of a family of structurally and functionally related proteins, including BPI, plasma cholesteryl ester transfer protein (CETP), and phospholipid transfer protein (PLTP). Finally, this gene is found on chromosome 20, immediately downstream of the BPI gene.

== Clinical significance ==
LPS exposure induces LBP production. LBP is synthesized by the liver, adipose tissue, and intestinal cells. Dietary glucose and saturated fats acutely increase plasma LBP.

The proinflammatory activity of plasma LPS is increased by LBP, which is higher in obesity.

Plasma LBP is used as a better biomarker of plasma LPS than LPS itself due to the short half-life of LPS.

== Interactions ==
Lipopolysaccharide-binding protein has been shown to interact with CD14, TLR2, TLR4 and the co-receptor MD-2.
