= Bactericidal permeability-increasing protein =

Mammalian protein found in Homo sapiens

BPI

Identifiers
- Aliases: BPI, bactericidal/permeability-increasing protein, BPIFD1, rbactericidal permeability increasing protein
- External IDs: OMIM: 109195; MGI: 3045315; GeneCards: BPI
Available structures
PDB	Ortholog search: PDBe RCSB
PDB	List of PDB id codes 1BP1, 1EWF

Gene location (Human)
Chr.	Chromosome 20 (human)
Band	20q11.23	Start	38,304,150 bp
Band	20q11.23	End	38,337,505 bp

Gene location (Mouse)
Chr.	Chromosome 2 (mouse)
Band	2|2 H1	Start	158,100,014 bp
Band	2|2 H1	End	158,126,451 bp
RNA expression pattern
Bgee	Human / Mouse (ortholog); Top expressed in: trabecular bone; bone marrow; bone marrow cell; mononuclear cell; monocyte; left testis; right testis; sperm; testicle; granulocyte / Top expressed in: spermatocyte; spermatid; testicle; More reference expression data
BioGPS	n/a
Gene ontology
Molecular function	lipid binding; lipopolysaccharide binding
Cellular component	extracellular exosome; membrane; cytoplasm; integral component of plasma membrane; extracellular region; extracellular space; azurophil granule lumen; specific granule lumen; cytoplasmic stress granule
Biological process	negative regulation of interleukin-6 production; negative regulation of interleukin-8 production; defense response to bacterium; negative regulation of tumor necrosis factor production; negative regulation of macrophage activation; immune response; antimicrobial humoral response; neutrophil degranulation; defense response to Gram-negative bacterium
Sources:Amigo / QuickGO
Orthologs
Databases	NCBI: entry; OMA: entry
Species	Human	Mouse
Entrez	671	329547
Ensembl	ENSG00000101425	ENSMUSG00000052922
UniProt	P17213	Q67E05
RefSeq (mRNA)	NM_001725	NM_177850; NM_001356542
RefSeq (protein)	NP_001716	NP_808518; NP_001343471
Location (UCSC)	Chr 20: 38.3 – 38.34 Mb	Chr 2: 158.1 – 158.13 Mb
PubMed search
- Wikidata
View/Edit Human	View/Edit Mouse

Bactericidal permeability-increasing protein
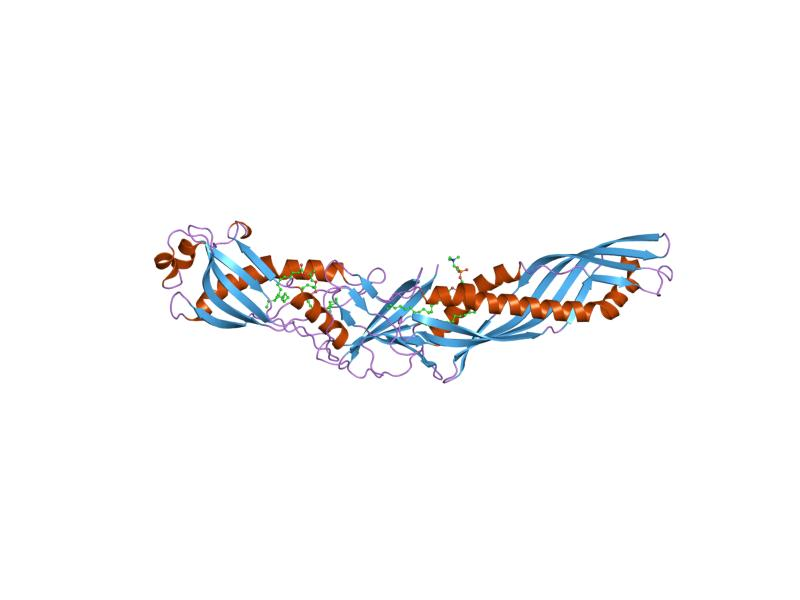
- 1EWF

Identifiers
- Symbol: BPI
- NCBI gene: 671
- HGNC: 1095
- OMIM: 109195
- RefSeq: NM_001725
- UniProt: P17213

Other data
- Locus: Chr. 20 q11.23
Search for
- Structures: Swiss-model
- Domains: InterPro

Bactericidal permeability-increasing protein (BPI) is a 456-residue (~50kDa) protein that is part of the innate immune system, coded for in the human by the BPI gene. It belongs to the family of lipid-binding serum glycoproteins.

== Distribution and function ==
BPI was initially identified in neutrophils, but is found in other tissues including the epithelial lining of mucous membranes. It is an endogenous antibiotic protein with potent killing activity against Gram-negative bacteria. It binds to compounds called lipopolysaccharides produced by Gram-negative bacteria. Lipolysaccharides are potent activators of the immune system; however, BPI at certain concentrations can prevent this activation.

BPI was discovered by Jerrold Weiss and Peter Elsbach at New York University Medical School.

== rBPI_{21} ==
Because lipopolysaccharides are potent inflammatory agents, and the action of antibiotics can result in the release of these compounds, the binding capacity of BPI was explored as a possible means of reducing injury. Xoma Ltd. developed a recombinant 21kDa portion of the BPI molecule called rBPI_{21}, NEUPREX, or opebecan. In a trial, it was found to decrease the mortality of Gram-negative bacterial-induced sepsis. Studies suggest that its binding activity is not the means by which it mediates its protective effect. Studies show biological effects with Gram-positive bacteria and even in infection by the protozoan, Toxoplasma gondii.

The N-terminal portion of murine BPI (199 amino acids) genetically fused to Halobacterium sp. NRC-1 GvpC protein was bound to the surface of gas vesicle nanoparticles (GVNPs) and tested for protective activity using a murine model of endotoxic shock. Depending on the time of delivery and exposure to lethal concentrations of lipopolysaccharide (LPS) and D-galactosamine, the treatment resulted in increased survival and reduced symptoms of inflammation, including inflammatory anemia, recruitment of neutrophils, liver apoptosis as well as increased pro-inflammatory serum cytokine levels. When administered via footpad and before LPS exposure, there was 100% survival of the experimental cohort.
