= Structural motif =

Type of common three-dimensional structure in chain-like biological molecules

In a chain-like biological molecule, such as a protein or nucleic acid, a structural motif is a common three-dimensional structure that appears in a variety of different, evolutionarily unrelated molecules. A structural motif does not have to be associated with a sequence motif; it can be represented by different and completely unrelated sequences in different proteins or RNA.

== In nucleic acids ==
Depending upon the sequence and other conditions, nucleic acids can form a variety of structural motifs which is thought to have biological significance.

Stem-loop
Stem-loop intramolecular base pairing is a pattern that can occur in single-stranded DNA or, more commonly, in RNA. The structure is also known as a hairpin or hairpin loop. It occurs when two regions of the same strand, usually complementary in nucleotide sequence when read in opposite directions, base-pair to form a double helix that ends in an unpaired loop. The resulting structure is a key building block of many RNA secondary structures.

Cruciform DNA
Cruciform DNA is a form of non-B DNA that requires at least a 6 nucleotide sequence of inverted repeats to form a structure consisting of a stem, branch point and loop in the shape of a cruciform, stabilized by negative DNA supercoiling. Two classes of cruciform DNA have been described; folded and unfolded.

G-quadruplex
G-quadruplex secondary structures (G4) are formed in nucleic acids by sequences that are rich in guanine. They are helical in shape and contain guanine tetrads that can form from one, two or four strands.

D-loop
A displacement loop or D-loop is a DNA structure where the two strands of a double-stranded DNA molecule are separated for a stretch and held apart by a third strand of DNA. An R-loop is similar to a D-loop, but in this case the third strand is RNA rather than DNA. The third strand has a base sequence which is complementary to one of the main strands and pairs with it, thus displacing the other complementary main strand in the region. Within that region the structure is thus a form of triple-stranded DNA. A diagram in the paper introducing the term illustrated the D-loop with a shape resembling a capital "D", where the displaced strand formed the loop of the "D".

== In proteins ==
In proteins, a structural motif describes the connectivity between secondary structural elements. An individual motif usually consists of only a few elements, e.g., the 'helix-turn-helix' motif which has just three. Note that, while the spatial sequence of elements may be identical in all instances of a motif, they may be encoded in any order within the underlying gene. In addition to secondary structural elements, protein structural motifs often include loops of variable length and unspecified structure. Structural motifs may also appear as tandem repeats.

Beta hairpin
Extremely common. Two antiparallel beta strands connected by a tight turn of a few amino acids between them.
Greek key
Four beta strands, three connected by hairpins, the fourth folded over the top.
Omega loop
A loop in which the residues that make up the beginning and end of the loop are very close together.
Helix-loop-helix
Consists of alpha helices bound by a looping stretch of amino acids. This motif is seen in transcription factors.
Zinc finger
Two beta strands with an alpha helix end folded over to bind a zinc ion. Important in DNA binding proteins.
Helix-turn-helix
Two α helices joined by a short strand of amino acids and found in many proteins that regulate gene expression.
Nest
Extremely common. Three consecutive amino acid residues form an anion-binding concavity.
Niche
Extremely common. Three or four consecutive amino acid residues form a cation-binding feature.

== See also ==
- Sequence motif
- Short linear motif
- Protein tandem repeats
