= UEV =

UEV may refer to:

- Unit Emergy Values, emergy inputs required to generate one unit of output from a process
- Kua-UEV, a human gene
