= Kua-UEV =

Protein-coding gene in the species Homo sapiens

PEDS1-UBE2V1
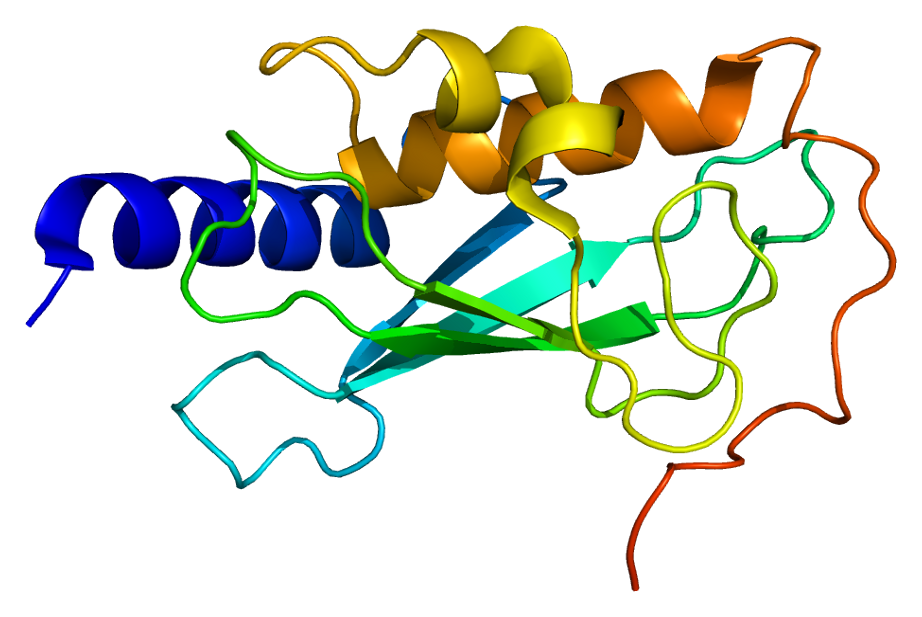
Available structures
PDB	Human UniProt search: PDBe RCSB
PDB	List of PDB id codes 2A4D, 2C2V, 2HLW

Identifiers
- Aliases: PEDS1-UBE2V1, CROC-1B, CROC1B, KUA-UEV, Kua-UEV, TMEM189-UBE2V1 readthrough, PEDS1-UBE2V1 readthrough, TMEM189-UBE2V1
- External IDs: HomoloGene: 100008; GeneCards: PEDS1-UBE2V1; OMA:PEDS1-UBE2V1 - orthologs

Gene location (Human)
Chr.	Chromosome 20 (human)
Band	20q13.13	Start	50,081,124 bp
Band	20q13.13	End	50,153,637 bp
RNA expression pattern
Bgee	Human / Mouse (ortholog); Top expressed in: stromal cell of endometrium; placenta; prefrontal cortex; right coronary artery; mucosa of esophagus; right lung; gastrocnemius muscle; superior frontal gyrus; ectocervix; monocyte / n/a; More reference expression data
BioGPS	n/a
Gene ontology
Molecular function	ubiquitin protein ligase binding; ubiquitin protein ligase activity; protein binding; ubiquitin conjugating enzyme activity
Cellular component	cytoplasm; integral component of membrane; endoplasmic reticulum membrane; membrane; endoplasmic reticulum; cytosol; ubiquitin conjugating enzyme complex; UBC13-UEV1A complex; ubiquitin ligase complex; extracellular exosome; nucleus; nucleoplasm; protein-containing complex
Biological process	protein ubiquitination; protein polyubiquitination; Fc-epsilon receptor signaling pathway; protein K63-linked ubiquitination; nucleotide-binding oligomerization domain containing signaling pathway; positive regulation of transcription, DNA-templated; stimulatory C-type lectin receptor signaling pathway; regulation of DNA repair; regulation of transcription, DNA-templated; T cell receptor signaling pathway; cell differentiation; postreplication repair; positive regulation of I-kappaB kinase/NF-kappaB signaling; JNK cascade; positive regulation of NF-kappaB transcription factor activity; interleukin-1-mediated signaling pathway
Sources:Amigo / QuickGO
Orthologs
Species	Human	Mouse
Entrez	387522	n/a
Ensembl	ENSG00000124208	n/a
UniProt	Q13404	n/a
RefSeq (mRNA)	NM_003349; NM_199203	n/a
RefSeq (protein)	NP_001155977; NP_954580; NP_954673; NP_001027459; NP_001244322 NP_001244323; NP_001244324; NP_001244325; NP_001244326; NP_001244327; NP_001244328; NP_001269504; NP_001269505; NP_001269506; NP_001269507; NP_001269508; NP_001269509; NP_068823; NP_071887; NP_954595; NP_954673	n/a
Location (UCSC)	Chr 20: 50.08 – 50.15 Mb	n/a
PubMed search		n/a
- Wikidata
View/Edit Human

Ubiquitin-conjugating enzyme E2 variant 1, also known as Kua-UEV, is a human gene.

The Kua-UEV mRNA is an infrequent but naturally occurring co-transcribed product of the neighboring Kua and UBE2V1 genes. Ubiquitin-conjugating E2 enzyme variant proteins constitute a distinct subfamily within the E2 protein family. They have sequence similarity to other ubiquitin-conjugating enzymes but lack the conserved cysteine residue that is critical for the catalytic activity of E2s. Two alternative transcripts encoding different isoforms have been described. The proteins produced by these transcripts have UEV1 B domains but the proteins are localized to the cytoplasm rather than to the nucleus. The significance of these co-transcribed mRNAs and the function of their protein products have not yet been determined.
